= Timeline of medicine and medical technology =

This is a timeline of the history of medicine and medical technology. (Note: The dates given for these medical works are uncertain. A Tribute to Hinduism suggests that Sushruta lived in the 5th century BC.)

== Antiquity ==
- c. 12000 BC – The earliest known example of dental caries manipulation is found in a Paleolithic man in Northern Italy.
- 7300 - 6200 BC – First evidence of trepanation, with signs of healing suggesting survival, identified in a skull in Ukraine.
- 3350 - 3105 BC - Ötzi dies with a parasitic whipworm infection while carrying Piptoporus betulinus, a type of birch fungus that contains toxic resins against whipworm and induces diarrhea. It has been likely used an anthelmintic medication.
- 3000 BC – The origins of Ayurveda traced back to around 3,000 BCE.
- c. 2600 BC – Imhotep the priest-physician to be later deified as the Egyptian god of medicine.
- 2500 BC – Egyptian inscription speaks of Iry as eye-doctor of the palace, palace physician of the belly, guardian of the royal bowels, and he who prepares the important medicine (name cannot be translated) and knows the inner juices of the body.
- 1900–1600 BC Akkadian clay tablets on medicine survive primarily as copies from Ashurbanipal's library at Nineveh.
- 1800 BC – Code of Hammurabi sets out fees for surgeons and punishments for malpractice
- 1800 BC – Kahun Gynecological Papyrus
- 1600 BC – Hearst papyrus, coprotherapy and magic
- 1551 BC – Ebers Papyrus, coprotherapy and magic
- 1500 BC – Saffron used as a medicine on the Aegean island of Thera in ancient Greece
- 1500 BC – Edwin Smith Papyrus, an Egyptian medical text and the oldest known surgical treatise (no true surgery) no magic
- 1300 BC – Brugsch Papyrus and London Medical Papyrus
- 1250 BC – Asklepios
- 9th century – Hesiod reports an ontological conception of disease via the Pandora myth. Disease has a "life" of its own but is of divine origin.
- 8th century – Homer tells that Polydamna supplied the Greek forces besieging Troy with healing drugs. Homer also tells about battlefield surgery Idomeneus tells Nestor after Machaon has fallen: A surgeon who can cut out an arrow and heal the wound with his ointments is worth a regiment.
- 700 BC – Cnidos medical school; also one at Cos
- 500 BC – Darius I orders the restoration of the House of Life (First record of a (much older) medical school)
- 500 BC – Bian Que becomes the earliest physician known to use acupuncture and pulse diagnosis
- 500 BC – The Sushruta Samhita is published, laying the framework for Ayurvedic medicine, giving many surgical procedures for first time such as lithotomy, forehead flap rhinoplasty, otoplasty and many more.
- c. 490 – c. 430 – Empedocles four elements
- 500 BC – Pills are used. They have been presumably invented so that measured amounts of a medicinal substance could be delivered to a patient.
- 510–430 BC – Alcmaeon of Croton scientific anatomic dissections. He studies the optic nerves and the brain, arguing that the brain was the seat of the senses and intelligence. He distinguishes veins from the arteries and has at least vague understanding of the circulation of the blood. Variously described by modern scholars as Father of Anatomy; Father of Physiology; Father of Embryology; Father of Psychology; Creator of Psychiatry; Founder of Gynecology; and as the Father of Medicine itself. There is little evidence to support the claims but he is, nonetheless, important.
- fl. 425 BC – Diogenes of Apollonia
- c. 484 – 425 BC – Herodotus tells us Egyptian doctors were specialists: Medicine is practiced among them on a plan of separation; each physician treats a single disorder, and no more. Thus the country swarms with medical practitioners, some undertaking to cure diseases of the eye, others of the head, others again of the teeth, others of the intestines, and some those which are not local.
- 496 – 405 BC – Sophocles "It is not a learned physician who sings incantations over pains which should be cured by cutting."
- 420 BC – Hippocrates of Cos maintains that diseases have natural causes and puts forth the Hippocratic Oath. Origin of rational medicine.

== Medicine after Hippocrates ==
- c. 400 BC – 1 BC – The Huangdi Neijing (Yellow Emperor's Classic of Internal Medicine) is published, laying the framework for traditional Chinese medicine
- 4th century BC – Philistion of Locri Praxagoras distinguishes veins and arteries and determines only arteries pulse
- 375–295 BC – Diocles of Carystus
- 354 BC – Critobulus of Cos extracts an arrow from the eye of Phillip II, treating the loss of the eyeball without causing facial disfigurement.
- 3rd century BC – Philinus of Cos founder of the Empiricist school. Herophilos and Erasistratus practice androtomy. (Dissecting live and dead human beings)
- 280 BC – Herophilus Dissection studies the nervous system and distinguishes between sensory nerves and motor nerves and the brain. also the anatomy of the eye and medical terminology such as (in Latin translation "net like" becomes retiform/retina.
- 270 – Huangfu Mi writes the Zhēnjiǔ jiǎyǐ jīng (The ABC Compendium of Acupuncture), the first textbook focusing solely on acupuncture
- 250 BC – Erasistratus studies the brain and distinguishes between the cerebrum and cerebellum physiology of the brain, heart and eyes, and in the vascular, nervous, respiratory and reproductive systems
- 219 – Zhang Zhongjing publishes Shang Han Lun (On Cold Disease Damage)
- 200 BC – the Charaka Samhita uses a rational approach to the causes and cure of disease and uses objective methods of clinical examination
- 124 – 44 BC – Asclepiades of Bithynia
- 116 – 27 BC – Marcus Terentius Varro Prototypal germ theory of disease.
- 1st century AD – Rufus of Ephesus; Marcellinus a physician of the first century AD; Numisianus
- 23 – 79 AD – Pliny the Elder writes Natural History
- c. 25 BC – c. 50 AD – Aulus Cornelius Celsus Medical encyclopedia
- 50 – 70 AD – Pedanius Dioscorides writes De Materia Medica – a precursor of modern pharmacopoeias that was in use for almost 1600 years
- 2nd century AD Aretaeus of Cappadocia
- 98 – 138 AD – Soranus of Ephesus
- 129 – 216 AD – Galen – Clinical medicine based on observation and experience. The resulting tightly integrated and comprehensive system, offering a complete medical philosophy dominated medicine throughout the Middle Ages and until the beginning of the modern era.

== After Galen 200 AD ==
- fl. before AD 210 – Fabulla or Fabylla, medical writer
- d. 260 – Gargilius Martialis, short Latin handbook on Medicines from Vegetables and Fruits
- 4th century Magnus of Nisibis, Alexandrian doctor and professor book on urine
- 325 – 400 – Oribasius 70 volume encyclopedia
- 362 – Julian orders xenones built, imitating Christian charity (proto hospitals)
- 369 – Basil of Caesarea founded at Caesarea in Cappadocia an institution (hospital) called Basileias, with several buildings for patients, nurses, physicians, workshops, and schools
- 375 – Ephrem the Syrian open a hospital at Edessa They spread out and specialized nosocomia for the sick, brephotrophia for foundlings, orphanotrophia for orphans, ptochia for the poor, xenodochia for poor or infirm pilgrims, and gerontochia for the old.
- 400 – The first hospital in Latin Christendom is founded by Fabiola at Rome
- 420 – Caelius Aurelianus a doctor from Sicca Veneria (El-Kef, Tunisia) handbook On Acute and Chronic Diseases in Latin.
- 447 – Cassius Felix of Cirta (Constantine, Ksantina, Algeria), medical handbook drew on Greek sources, Methodist and Galenist in Latin
- 480 – 547 Benedict of Nursia founder of "monastic medicine"
- 484 – 590 – Flavius Magnus Aurelius Cassiodorus
- fl. 511 – 534 – Anthimus Greek: Ἄνθιμος
- 536 – Sergius of Reshaina (died 536) – A Christian theologian-physician who translated thirty-two of Galen's works into Syriac and wrote medical treatises of his own
- 525 – 605 – Alexander of Tralles Alexander Trallianus
- 500 – 550 – Aetius of Amida Encyclopedia 4 books each divided into 4 sections
- second half of 6th century building of xenodocheions/bimārestāns by the Nestorians under the Sasanians, would evolve into the complex secular "Islamic hospital", which combined lay practice and Galenic teaching
- 550 – 630 Stephanus of Athens
- 560 – 636 – Isidore of Seville
- c. 620 Aaron of Alexandria Syriac writes 30 books on medicine, the "Pandects". He is the first author in antiquity who mentions the diseases of smallpox and measles translated by Māsarjawaih a Syrian Jew and Physician, into Arabic about A. D. 683
- c. 630 – Paul of Aegina Encyclopedia in 7 books very detailed surgery used by Albucasis
- 790 – 869 – Leo Itrosophist also Mathematician or Philosopher wrote "Epitome of Medicine"
- c. 800 – 873 – Al-Kindi (Alkindus) De Gradibus
- 820 – Benedictine hospital founded, School of Salerno would grow around it
- d. 857 – Mesue the elder (Yūḥannā ibn Māsawayh) Syriac Christian
- c. 830 – 870 – Hunayn ibn Ishaq (Johannitius) Syriac-speaking Christian also knows Greek and Arabic. Translator and author of several medical tracts.
- c. 838 – 870 – Ali ibn Sahl Rabban al-Tabari, writes an encyclopedia of medicine in Arabic.
- c. 910d – Ishaq ibn Hunayn
- 9th century – Yahya ibn Sarafyun a Syriac physician Johannes Serapion, Serapion the Elder
- c. 865 – 925 – Rhazes pediatrics, and makes the first clear distinction between smallpox and measles in his al-Hawi.
- d. 955 – Isaac Judaeus Isḥāq ibn Sulaymān al-Isrāʾīlī Egyptian born Jewish physician
- 913 – 982 – Shabbethai Donnolo alleged founding father of School of Salerno writes in Hebrew
- d. 982 – 994 – 'Ali ibn al-'Abbas al-Majusi Haly Abbas
- 1000 – Albucasis (936–1018) surgery Kitab al-Tasrif, surgical instruments.
- d. 1075 – Ibn Butlan Christian physician of Baghdad Tacuinum sanitatis the Arabic original and most of the Latin copies, are in tabular format
- 1018 – 1087 – Michael Psellos or Psellus a Byzantine monk, writer, philosopher, politician and historian. several books on medicine
- c. 1030 – Avicenna The Canon of Medicine The Canon remains a standard textbook in Muslim and European universities until the 18th century.
- c. 1071 – 1078 – Simeon Seth or Symeon Seth an 11th-century Jewish Byzantine translates Arabic works into Greek
- 1084 – First documented hospital in England Canterbury
- d. 1087 – Constantine the African
- 1083 – 1153 – Anna Komnene, Latinized as Comnena
- 1095 – Congregation of the Antonines, is founded to treat victims of "St. Anthony's fire" a skin disease.
- Late 11th or early 12th century – Trotula
- 1123 – St Bartholomew's Hospital founded by the court jester Rahere Augustine nuns originally cared for the patients. Mental patients were accepted along with others
- 1127 – Stephen of Antioch translates the work of Haly Abbas
- 1100 – 1161 – Avenzoar Teacher of Averroes
- 1170 – Rogerius Salernitanus composes his Chirurgia also known as The Surgery of Roger
- 1126 – 1198 – Averroes
- d. c. 1161 – Matthaeus Platearius

== 1200–1499 ==
- 1203 – Innocent III organizes the hospital of Santo Spirito at Rome inspiring others all over Europe
- c. 1210 – 1277 – William of Saliceto, also known as Guilielmus de Saliceto
- 1210 – 1295 – Taddeo Alderotti – Scholastic medicine
- 1240 Bartholomeus Anglicus
- 1242 – Ibn al-Nafis suggests that the right and left ventricles of the heart are separate and discovers the pulmonary circulation and coronary circulation
- c. 1248 – Ibn al-Baytar writes on botany and pharmacy, studied animal anatomy and medicine veterinary medicine.
- 1249 – Roger Bacon writes about convex lens spectacles for treating long-sightedness
- 1257 – 1316 Pietro d'Abano also known as Petrus De Apono or Aponensis
- 1260 – Louis IX establishes Les Quinze-vingt; originally a retreat for the blind, it became a hospital for eye diseases, and is now one of the most important medical centers in Paris
- c. 1260 – 1320 Henri de Mondeville
- 1284 – Mansur hospital of Cairo
- c. 1275 – c. 1328 Joannes Zacharias Actuarius a Byzantine physician writes the last great compendium of Byzantine medicine
- 1275 –1326 – Mondino de Luzzi "Mundinus" carries out the first systematic human dissections since Herophilus of Chalcedon and Erasistratus of Ceos 1500 years earlier.
  Anathomia, 1541
- 1288 – The hospital of Santa Maria Nuova founded in Florence, it is a strictly medical one.
- 1300 – concave lens spectacles to treat myopia is developed in Italy.
- 1310 – Pietro d'Abano's Conciliator (c. 1310)
- d. 1348 – Gentile da Foligno
- 1292–1350 – Ibn Qayyim al-Jawziya
- 1306–1390 – John of Arderne
- d. 1368 – Guy de Chauliac
- f. 1460 – Heinrich von Pfolspeundt
- 1443 – 1502 – Antonio Benivieni Pathological anatomy
- 1493 – 1541 – Paracelsus On the relationship between medicine and surgery surgery book

== 1500–1699 ==
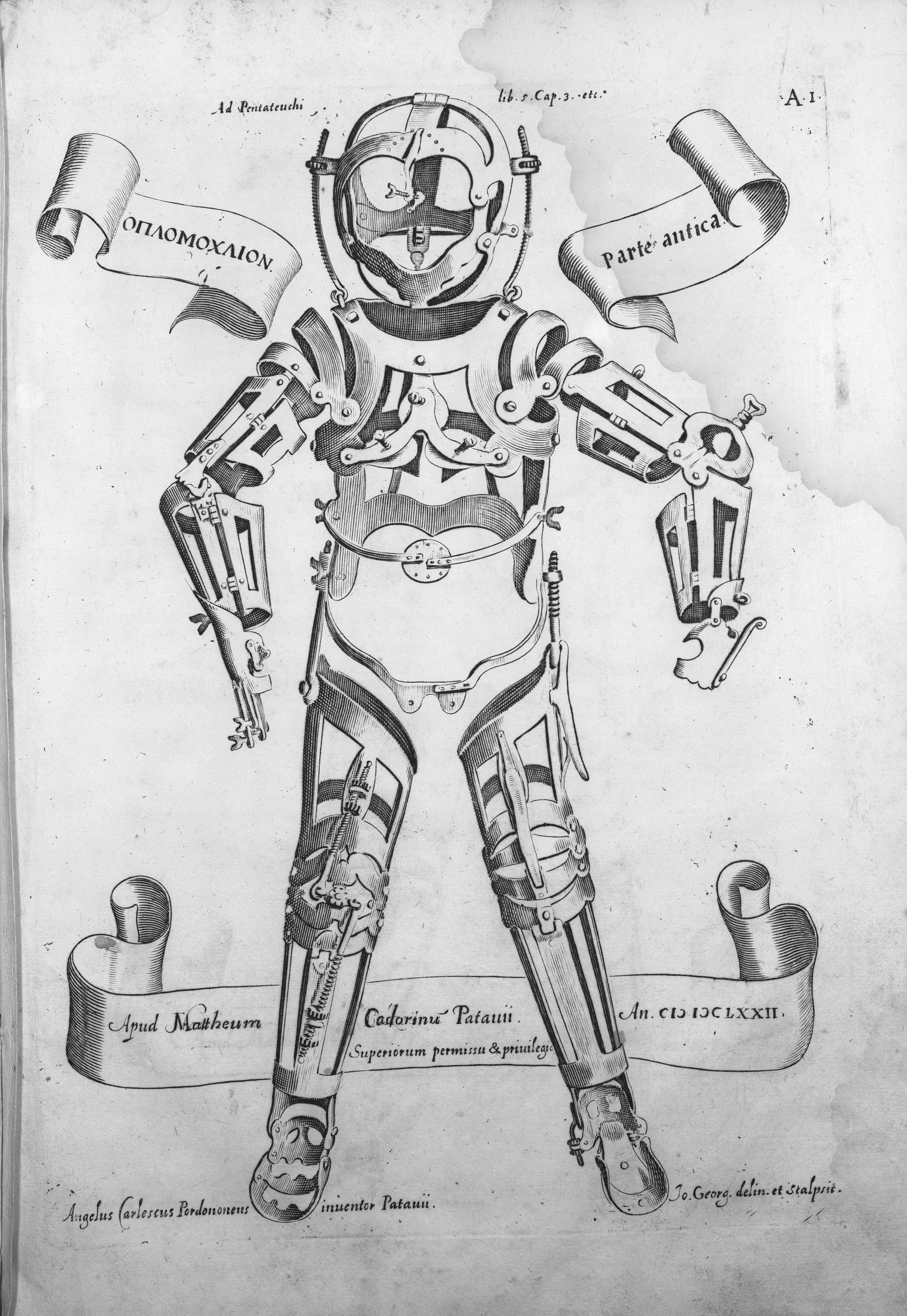
Hieronymus Fabricius, Operationes chirurgicae, 1685

- Early 16th century:
  - Paracelsus, an alchemist by trade, rejects occultism and pioneers the use of chemicals and minerals in medicine. Burns the books of Avicenna, Galen and Hippocrates.
  - Hieronymus Fabricius His "Surgery" is mostly that of Celsus, Paul of Aegina, and Abulcasis citing them by name.
  - Caspar Stromayr
- 1500? – 1561 Pierre Franco
- Ambroise Paré (1510–1590) pioneers the treatment of gunshot wounds.
  - Bartholomeo Maggi at Bologna, Felix Wurtz of Zurich, Léonard Botal in Paris, and the Englishman Thomas Gale (surgeon), (the diversity of their geographical origins attests to the widespread interest of surgeons in the problem), all published works urging similar treatment to Paré's. But it was Paré's writings which were the most influential.
- 1518 – College of Physicians founded, now known as Royal College of Physicians of London is a British professional body of doctors of general medicine and its subspecialties. It received the royal charter in 1518
- 1510 – 1590 – Ambroise Paré surgeon
- 1540 – 1604 – William Clowes – Surgical chest for military surgeons
- 1543 – Andreas Vesalius publishes De Fabrica Corporis Humani which corrects Greek medical errors and revolutionizes European medicine
- 1546 – Girolamo Fracastoro proposes that epidemic diseases are caused by transferable seedlike entities
- 1550 – 1612 – Peter Lowe
- 1553 – Miguel Servet describes the circulation of blood through the lungs.
- 1556 – Amato Lusitano describes venous valves in the Ázigos vein
- 1559 – Realdo Colombo describes the circulation of blood through the lungs in detail
- 1563 – Garcia de Orta founds tropical medicine with his treatise on Indian diseases and treatments
- 1570 – 1643 – John Woodall Ship surgeons use lemon juice to treat scurvy wrote "The Surgions Mate"
- 1590 – Microscope is invented, which played a huge part in medical advancement
- 1596 – Li Shizhen publishes Běncǎo Gāngmù or Compendium of Materia Medica
- 1603 – Girolamo Fabrici studies leg veins and notices that they have valves which allow blood to flow only toward the heart
- 1621 – 1676 – Richard Wiseman
- 1628 – William Harvey explains the circulatory system in Exercitatio Anatomica de Motu Cordis et Sanguinis in Animalibus
- 1665 – Robert Hooke identifies and names cells after observing them in cork under a microscope, although he did not identify their connection to life.
- 1683 – 1758 – Lorenz Heister
- 1688 – 1752 – William Cheselden

== 18th century ==
- 1701 – Giacomo Pylarini gives the first smallpox inoculations in Europe. They have been widely practised in the East before then.
- 1714 – 1789 – Percivall Pott
- 1720 – Lady Mary Wortley Montagu
- 1728 – 1793 – John Hunter
- 1736 – Claudius Aymand performs the first successful appendectomy
- 1744 – 1795 – Pierre-Joseph Desault First surgical periodical
- 1747 – James Lind discovers that citrus fruits prevent scurvy
- 1749 – 1806 – Benjamin Bell – Leading surgeon of his time and father of a surgical dynasty, author of "A System of Surgery"
- 1752 – 1832 – Antonio Scarpa
- 1763 – 1820 – John Bell
- 1766 – 1842 – Dominique Jean Larrey Surgeon to Napoleon
- 1768 – 1843 – Astley Cooper surgeon lectures principles and practice
- 1774 – 1842 – Charles Bell, surgeon
- 1774 – Joseph Priestley discovers nitrous oxide, nitric oxide, ammonia, hydrogen chloride and oxygen
- 1777 – 1835 – Baron Guillaume Dupuytren – Head surgeon at Hôtel-Dieu de Paris, The age Dupuytren
- 1785 – William Withering publishes "An Account of the Foxglove" the first systematic description of digitalis in treating dropsy
- 1790 – Samuel Hahnemann rages against the prevalent practice of bloodletting as a universal cure and founds homeopathy
- 1796 – Edward Jenner develops a smallpox vaccination method
- 1799 – Humphry Davy discovers the anesthetic properties of nitrous oxide

== 19th century ==
- 1800 – Humphry Davy announces the anaesthetic properties of nitrous oxide.
- 1803 – 1841 – Morphine was first isolated by Friedrich Sertürner, this is generally believed to be the first isolation of an active ingredient from a plant.
- 1813–1883 – James Marion Sims vesico-vaganial surgery Father of surgical gynecology.
- 1816 – René Laennec invents the stethoscope.
- 1827 – 1912 – Joseph Lister antiseptic surgery Father of modern surgery
- 1818 – James Blundell performs the first successful human transfusion.
- 1842 – Crawford Long performs the first surgical operation using anesthesia with ether.
- 1845 – John Hughes Bennett first describes leukemia as a blood disorder.
- 1846 – First painless surgery with general anesthetic.
- 1847 – Ignaz Semmelweis discovers how to prevent puerperal fever.
- 1849 – Elizabeth Blackwell is the first woman to gain a medical degree in the United States.
- 1850 – Female Medical College of Pennsylvania (later Woman's Medical College), the first medical college in the world to grant degrees to women, is founded in Philadelphia.
- 1858 – Rudolf Carl Virchow 13 October 1821 – 5 September 1902 his theories of cellular pathology spelled the end of Humoral medicine.
- 1861 – Louis Pasteur discovers the germ theory of disease.
- 1861 – Snellen chart developed by Herman Snellen.
- 1867 – Lister publishes Antiseptic Principle of the Practice of Surgery, based partly on Pasteur's work.
- 1870 – Louis Pasteur and Robert Koch establish the germ theory of disease.
- 1878 – Ellis Reynolds Shipp graduates from the Women's Medical College of Pennsylvania and begins practice in Utah.
- 1879 – First vaccine for cholera.
- 1881 – Louis Pasteur develops an anthrax vaccine.
- 1882 – Louis Pasteur develops a rabies vaccine.
- 1887 – Willem Einthoven invents electrocardiography (ECG/EKG)
- 1890 – Emil von Behring discovers antitoxins and uses them to develop tetanus and diphtheria vaccines.
- 1895 – Wilhelm Conrad Röntgen discovers medical use of X-rays in medical imaging

== 20th century ==
=== 1900s ===
- 1901 – Karl Landsteiner discovers the existence of different human blood types
- 1901 – Alois Alzheimer identifies the first case of what becomes known as Alzheimer's disease
- 1906 – Frederick Hopkins suggests the existence of vitamins and suggests that a lack of vitamins causes scurvy and rickets
- 1907 – Paul Ehrlich develops a chemotherapeutic cure for sleeping sickness
- 1907 – Henry Stanley Plummer develops the first structured patient record and clinical number (Mayo clinic)
- 1908 – Victor Horsley and R. Clarke invents the stereotactic method
- 1909 – First intrauterine device described by Richard Richter.
- 1910 – Hans Christian Jacobaeus performs the first laparoscopy on humans

=== 1910s ===
- 1917 – Julius Wagner-Jauregg discovers the malarial fever shock therapy for general paresis of the insane

=== 1920s ===
- 1921 – Edward Mellanby discovers vitamin D and shows that its absence causes rickets
- 1921 – Frederick Banting and Charles Best discover insulin – important for the treatment of diabetes
- 1921 – Fidel Pagés pioneers epidural anesthesia
- 1923 – First vaccine for diphtheria
- 1924 – Hans Berger discovers human electroencephalography
- 1926 – First vaccine for pertussis
- 1927 – First vaccine for tuberculosis
- 1927 – First vaccine for tetanus

=== 1930s ===
- 1930 – First successful sex reassignment surgery performed on Lili Elbe in Dresden, Germany.
- 1932 – Gerhard Domagk develops a chemotherapeutic cure for streptococcus
- 1933 – Manfred Sakel discovers insulin shock therapy
- 1935 – Ladislas J. Meduna discovers metrazol shock therapy
- 1935 – First vaccine for yellow fever
- 1936 – Egas Moniz discovers prefrontal lobotomy for treating mental diseases; Enrique Finochietto develops the now ubiquitous self-retaining thoracic retractor
- 1938 – Ugo Cerletti and Lucio Bini discover electroconvulsive therapy
- 1938 – Howard Florey and Ernst Chain investigate Penicillin and attempted to mass-produce it and tested it on the policeman Albert Alexander (police officer) who recovered but died due to a lack of Penicillin

=== 1940s ===
- 1943 – Willem J. Kolff builds the first dialysis machine
- 1944 – Disposable catheter – David S. Sheridan
- 1946 – Chemotherapy – Alfred G. Gilman and Louis S. Goodman
- 1947 – Defibrillator – Claude Beck
- 1948 – Acetaminophen – Julius Axelrod, Bernard Brodie
- 1948 – The World Health Organization (WHO) is founded as a specialised agency of the United Nations.
- 1949 – First implant of intraocular lens, by Sir Harold Ridley
- 1949 – Mechanical assistor for anesthesia – John Emerson

=== 1950s ===
- 1952 – Jonas Salk develops the first polio vaccine (available in 1955)
- 1952 – Cloning – Robert Briggs and Thomas King
- 1953 – First live birth from frozen sperm
- 1953 – Heart-lung machine – John Heysham Gibbon
- 1953 – Medical ultrasonography – Inge Edler
- 1954 – Joseph Murray performs the first human kidney transplant (on identical twins)
- 1954 – Ventouse – Tage Malmstrom
- 1955 – Tetracycline – Lloyd Conover
- 1956 – Metered-dose inhaler – 3M
- 1957 – William Grey Walter invents the brain EEG topography (toposcope)
- 1958 – Pacemaker – Rune Elmqvist
- 1959 – In vitro fertilization – Min Chueh Chang

=== 1960s ===
- 1960 – Invention of cardiopulmonary resuscitation (CPR)
- 1960 – First combined oral contraceptive approved by the FDA
- 1962 – Hip replacement – John Charnley
- 1962 – Beta blocker James W. Black
- 1962 – Albert Sabin develops first oral polio vaccine
- 1963 – Artificial heart – Paul Winchell
- 1963 – Thomas Starzl performs the first human liver transplant
- 1963 – James Hardy performs the first human lung transplant
- 1963 – Valium (diazepam) – Leo H. Sternbach
- 1964 – First vaccine for measles
- 1965 – Frank Pantridge installs the first portable defibrillator
- 1965 – First commercial ultrasound
- 1966 – C. Walton Lillehei performs the first human pancreas transplant
- 1966 – Rubella Vaccine – Harry Martin Meyer and Paul D. Parkman
- 1967 – First vaccine for mumps
- 1967 – René Favaloro develops Coronary Bypass surgery
- 1967 – Christiaan Barnard performs the first human heart transplant
- 1968 – Powered prothesis – Samuel Alderson
- 1968 – Controlled drug delivery – Alejandro Zaffaron
- 1969 – Balloon catheter – Thomas Fogarty
- 1969 – Cochlear implant – William House

=== 1970s ===
- 1970 – Cyclosporine, the first effective immunosuppressive drug is introduced in organ transplant practice
- 1971 – MMR Vaccine – developed by Maurice Hilleman
- 1971 – Genetically modified organisms – Ananda Chakrabart
- 1971 – Magnetic resonance imaging – Raymond Vahan Damadian
- 1971 – Computed tomography (CT or CAT Scan) – Godfrey Hounsfield
- 1971 – Transdermal patches – Alejandro Zaffaroni
- 1971 – Sir Godfrey Hounsfield invents the first commercial CT scanner
- 1972 – Insulin pump Dean Kamen
- 1973 – Laser eye surgery (LASIK) – Mani Lal Bhaumik
- 1974 – Liposuction – Giorgio Fischer
- 1976 – First commercial PET scanner
- 1978 – First live birth from in vitro fertilisation (IVF)
- 1978 – Last fatal case of smallpox
- 1979 – Antiviral drugs – George Hitchings and Gertrude Elion

=== 1980s ===
- 1980 – Smallpox is declared eradicated by the WHO.
- 1980 – Raymond Damadian builds first commercial MRI scanner
- 1980 – Lithotripter – Dornier Research Group
- 1980 – First vaccine for hepatitis B – Baruch Samuel Blumberg
- 1980 – Cloning of interferons – Sidney Pestka
- 1981 – Artificial skin – John F. Burke and Ioannis V. Yannas
- 1981 – Bruce Reitz performs the first human heart-lung combined transplant
- 1982 – Human insulin – Eli Lilly
- 1982 – Willem Johan Kolff performs the first artificial heart transplant.
- 1985 – Automated DNA sequencer – Leroy Hood and Lloyd Smith
- 1985 – Polymerase chain reaction (PCR) – Kary Mullis
- 1985 – Surgical robot – Yik San Kwoh
- 1985 – DNA fingerprinting – Alec Jeffreys
- 1985 – Capsule endoscopy – Tarun Mullick
- 1986 – Fluoxetine HCl – Eli Lilly and Co
- 1987 – commercially available Statins – Merck & Co.
- 1987 – Tissue engineering – Joseph Vacanti & Robert Langer
- 1988 – Intravascular stent – Julio Palmaz
- 1988 – Laser cataract surgery – Patricia Bath
- 1989 – Pre-implantation genetic diagnosis (PGD) – Alan Handyside
- 1989 – DNA microarray – Stephen Fodor

=== 1990s ===
- 1990 – Gamow bag® – Igor Gamow
- 1992 – Description of Brugada syndrome (Pedro and Josep Brugada)
- 1992 – First vaccine for hepatitis A available
- 1992 – Electroactive polymers (artificial muscle) – SRI International
- 1992 – Intracytoplasmic sperm injection (ICSI) – Andre van Steirteghem
- 1995 – Adult stem cell use in regeneration of tissues and organs in vivo – B. G Matapurkar U.S . International Patent
- 1996 – Dolly the Sheep cloned
- 1998 – Stem cell therapy – James Thomson
- 1999 – The hormone Ghrelin is identified by Japanese scientists Masayasu Kojima, Kenji Kangawa and their colleagues.

== 21st century ==
=== 2000s ===
- 2000 – The Human Genome Project draft was completed.
- 2001 – The first telesurgery was performed by Jacques Marescaux.
- 2003 – Carlo Urbani, of Doctors without Borders alerted the World Health Organization to the threat of the SARS virus, triggering the most effective response to an epidemic in history. Urbani succumbs to the disease himself in less than a month.
- 2005 – Jean-Michel Dubernard performs the first partial face transplant.
- 2006 – First HPV vaccine approved.
- 2006 – The second rotavirus vaccine approved (first was withdrawn).
- 2007 – The visual prosthetic (bionic eye) Argus II.
- 2008 – Laurent Lantieri performs the first full face transplant.

=== 2010s ===
- 2011 – First successful Uterus transplant from a deceased donor in Turkey
- 2013 – The first kidney grown in vitro in the U.S.
- 2013 – The first human liver was grown from stem cells in Japan.
- 2014 – A 3D printer is used for first ever skull transplant.
- 2014 - Sonendo, a medical technology company based in Laguna Hills, California, introduces the GentleWave system in the United States for root canal treatments.
- 2016 – The first ever artificial pancreas was created
- 2019 – 3D-print heart from human patient's cells.

=== 2020s ===
- 2020 – First vaccine for COVID-19.
- 2022 – The complete human genome is sequenced.

== See also ==
- Timeline of antibiotics
- Timeline of vaccines
- Timeline of hospitals

== Citations ==
- 1. International patent USA. .wef 1995. US PTO no.6227202 and 20020007223.
- 2. R. Maingot's Text Book of Abdominal operations.1997 USA.
- 3. Text book of Obstetrics and Gynecology. 2010 J P Publishers.
