= John Read (surgeon) =

John Read (fl. 1587-1588) was an English surgeon and medical writer.

== Life ==
In Gloucester in 1587, Read was instrumental in having a Flemish quack practitioner prosecuted. He came to London about that time, and in 1588 was licensed to practise there as a surgeon.

== Works ==
He belonged to the group of Elizabethan surgeons who set themselves to improve the position of English surgery. They wrote in English, and sought to demarcate surgeons from quacks. Others of a like mind were John Banester, William Clowes, Thomas Gale, and John Halle.

In 1588 Read published a composite work, based on a translation from a surgical text of Franciscus Arceus (Francisco Arceo, 1494–1575). There are other elements. Prefixed to the translation is A Complaint of the Abuses of the Noble Art of Chirurgerie, written in verse by Read. There is a work on fistula by John Arderne, and a version of the Hippocratic oath. There are additions of Read's own.

Read dedicated his book to Banester, Clowes, and William Pickering. The work contained aspirations, that "the Barbers craft ought to be a distinct mistery from chirurgery", and "chirurgians ought to be seene in physicke", that in the British context were delayed until 1745, and 1868, respectively.

== Family ==
Read married, on 24 June 1588, John Banester's daughter Cicily.

== Notes ==
Attribution

This article incorporates text from a publication now in the public domain: Lee, Sidney, ed. (1896). "Read, John". Dictionary of National Biography. Vol. 47. London: Smith, Elder & Co.
