= Pandects (disambiguation) =

The Pandects, better known as the Digest, is a compendium of writings on Roman law.

Pandects (Greek Pandektai, Latin Pandectae) may also refer to:

- Pandects of Aaron of Alexandria (7th century)
- Pandects of Antiochus of Palestine (7th century)
- Pandectae of Yahya ibn Sarafyun (9th century)
- Pandects of Nikon of the Black Mountain (11th century)
- Pandectae Medicinae of Matthaeus Silvaticus (14th century)
- Pandectae, 1548 edition of the Bibliotheca universalis
- Pandect, a manuscript volume containing all the books of the Bible
