= Greek contributions to the Islamic world =

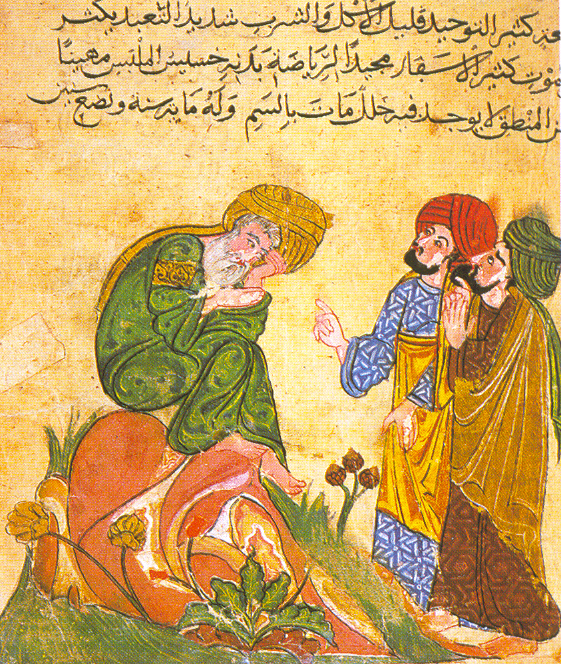
An Arabic manuscript from the 13th century depicting Socrates (Soqrāt) in discussion with his pupils.

Greece played a crucial role in the transmission of classical knowledge to the Islamic world. Its rich historiographical tradition preserved Ancient Greek knowledge upon which Islamic art, architecture, literature, philosophy and technological achievements were built. Ibn Khaldun once noted; The sciences of only one nation, the Greeks, have come down to us, because they were translated through Al-Ma'mun’s efforts. He was successful in this direction because he had many translators at his disposal and spent much money in this connection.

Scholar Toby Huff lists twelve major intellectuals from Greece that immensely influenced Islamic scholars, and notes the extraordinary impact that Greek natural science and philosophy had on the Islamic Golden Age, stating that:

What writers on the history of Arabic Islamic science often forget or omit is the extraordinary legacy of Greek natural science and philosophy that was translated and without which it can be argued there would not have been a golden age of scientific inquiry in the Muslim world.

One example of Greek influence is in the field of Islamic medicine, in which Islamic medicine was primarily founded upon the legacies of Greek and Roman physicians and scholars, most notably Galen and Hippocrates. Islamic scholars carefully translated these extensive medical works from Greek into Arabic, using them as the foundation to subsequently generate new medical knowledge.

The common and persistent myth claiming that Islamic scholars “saved” the classical work of Aristotle and other Greek philosophers from destruction is inaccurate. Arabic scholars were indeed responsible for the initial transmission of many Greek texts to Western Europe (translated to Latin from Arabic), with many original Greek texts not leaving the Byzantine Empire until the Renaissance. Medieval possession of Greek texts in Latin was largely thanks to Arabic scholars, but today the original Greek is accessible thanks to Renaissance scholars. According to the myth, these works would otherwise have perished in the long European Dark Ages between the fifth and the tenth centuries. Ancient Greek texts and Greek culture were never “lost” to be somehow “recovered” and “transmitted” by Islamic scholars, but rather were preserved and studied by the scholars and monks of the Byzantines and passed on to the rest of Europe and to the Islamic world at various times. Aristotle had been translated in France at the abbey of Mont Saint-Michel before translations of Aristotle into Arabic (via the Syriac of the Christian scholars from the conquered lands of the Byzantine Empire). Michael Harris points out:

The great writings of the classical era, particularly those of Greece … were always available to the Byzantines and to those Western peoples in cultural and diplomatic contact with the Eastern Empire.… Of the Greek classics known today, at least seventy-five percent are known through Byzantine copies.

Historian John Julius Norwich adds that “much of what we know about antiquity—especially Hellenic and Roman literature and Roman law—would have been lost forever if it weren’t for the scholars and scribes of Constantinople.”

Ibn Khaldun pointed out that the one civilization from which the Arabs had learned the sciences, was that of the Greeks, thanks to the translations by Christian (Assyrians) scholars of Greek texts into Syriac and then into Arabic. Ibn Khaldun also records that Abbasid caliph al-Mansur requested from the Byzantine Emperor the mathematical works of the Greeks.

== Hellenistic period ==
The Hellenistic period began in the 4th century BC with Alexander the Great's conquest of the eastern Mediterranean, Egypt, Mesopotamia, the Iranian plateau, Central Asia, and parts of India, leading to the spread of the Greek language and culture across these areas. Greek became the language of scholarship throughout the Hellenistic world, and Greek mathematics merged with Egyptian and Babylonian mathematics to give rise to a Hellenistic mathematics.

The most important centre of learning during this period was Alexandria in Egypt, which attracted scholars from across the Hellenistic world, mostly Greek and Egyptian, but also Jewish, Persian, Phoenician scholars.

Most of the mathematical texts written in Greek have been found in Greece, Egypt, Asia Minor, Mesopotamia, and Sicily.

== Classical and ecclesiastical studies ==
Byzantine science was essentially classical science. Therefore, Byzantine science was in every period closely connected with ancient-pagan philosophy, and metaphysics. Despite some opposition to pagan learning, many of the most distinguished classical scholars held high office in the Church. The most noteworthy oppositions include the closing of the Platonic Academy in 529, the obscurantism of Cosmas Indicopleustes, the condemnation of Ioannis Italos (1082) and of Georgios Plethon because of their devotion to ancient philosophy. The writings of antiquity never ceased to be cultivated in the Byzantine Empire due to the impetus given to classical studies by the Academy of Athens in the 4th and 5th centuries, the vigor of the philosophical academy of Alexandria, and to the services of the University of Constantinople, which concerned itself entirely with secular subjects, to the exclusion of theology, which was taught in the Patriarchical Academy. Even the latter offered instruction in the ancient classics, and included literary, philosophical, and scientific texts in its curriculum. The monastic schools concentrated upon the Bible, theology, and liturgy. Therefore, the monastic scriptoria expended most of their efforts upon the transcription of ecclesiastical manuscripts, while ancient-pagan literature was transcribed, summarized, excerpted, and annotated by laymen or enlightened bishops like Photios, Arethas of Caesarea, Eustathius of Thessalonica, and Basilius Bessarion.

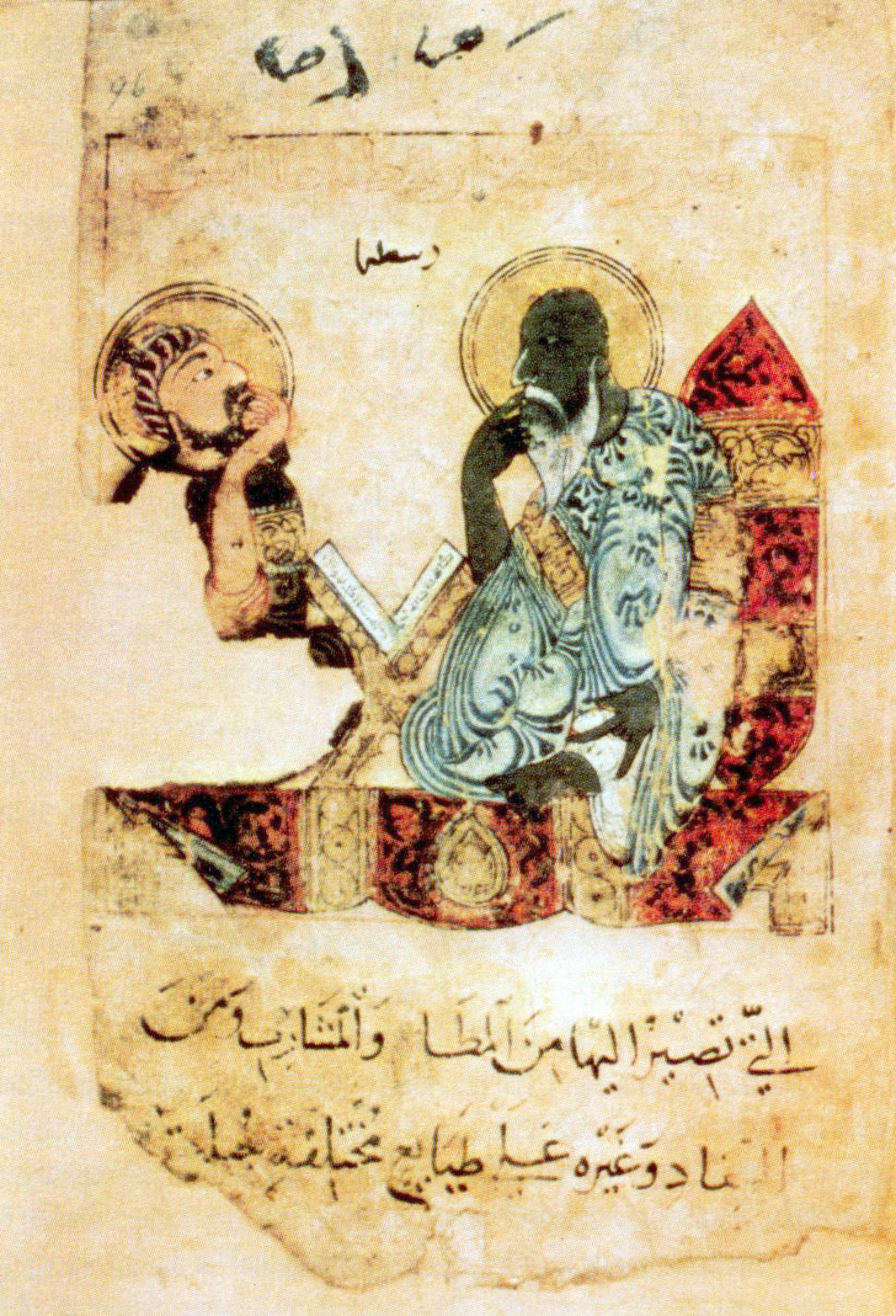
A medieval Arabic representation of Aristotle teaching a student.

When Saint Cyril was sent by the Byzantine emperor in an embassy to the Arabs in the ninth century, he astonished his Muslim hosts with his knowledge of philosophy and science as well as theology. Historian Maria Mavroudi recounts:

When asked how it was possible for him to know all that he did, he [Cyril] drew an analogy between the Muslim reaction to his erudition and the pride of someone who kept sea water in a wine skin and boasted of possessing a rare liquid. He finally encountered someone from a region by the sea, who explained that only a madman would brag about the contents of the wine skin, since people from his own homeland possessed an endless abundance of sea water. The Muslims are like the man with the wine skin and the [Greeks] like the man from the sea because, according to the saint’s concluding remark in his response, all learning emanated from the [Greeks].

== Mathematics ==
Byzantine scientists preserved and continued the legacy of the great Ancient Greek mathematicians and put mathematics in practice. In early Byzantium (5th to 7th centuries) the architects and mathematicians Isidore of Miletus and Anthemius of Tralles used complex mathematical formulas to construct the great Hagia Sophia church, a technological breakthrough for its time and for centuries afterwards due to its striking geometry, bold design and height. In late Byzantium (9th to 12th centuries) mathematicians like Michael Psellos considered mathematics as a way to interpret the world.

After learning of Leo the Mathematician, the Abbasid caliph al-Mamun was so impressed by his knowledge of mathematics, providing proofs that his own scholars were unable to complete, and predictive abilities that he offered Leo great riches to come to Baghdad.

== Medicine ==
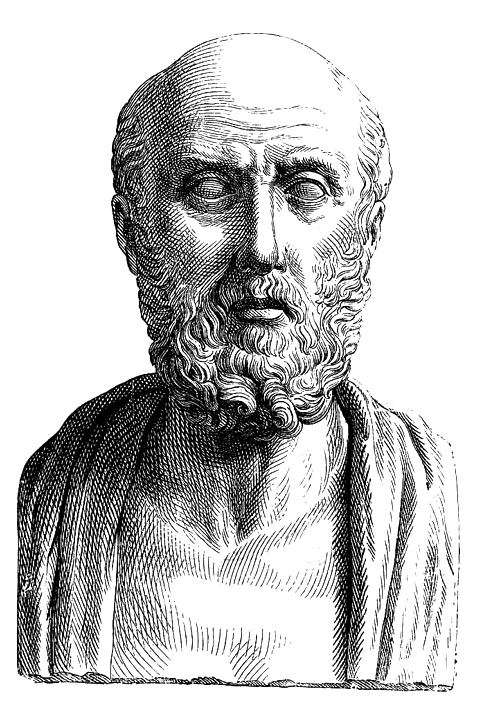
The physician Hippocrates, known as the Father of Medicine.

Medicine was one of the sciences in which the Byzantines improved on their Greco-Roman predecessors. As a result, Byzantine medicine had an influence on Islamic medicine as well as the medicine of the Renaissance.

The first known Greek medical school opened in Cnidus in 700 BC. Alcmaeon, author of the first anatomical work, worked at this school, and it was here that the practice of observing patients was established. Ancient Greek medicine revolved around the theory of humours. The most important figure in ancient Greek medicine is the physician Hippocrates, known as the "Father of Medicine", who established his own medical school at Cos. Hippocrates and his students documented many conditions in the Hippocratic Corpus, and developed the Hippocratic Oath for physicians, still in use today. The Greek Galen was one of the greatest surgeons of the ancient world and performed many audacious operations—including brain and eye surgeries— that were not tried again for almost two millennia. The writings of Hippocrates, Galen, and others had a lasting influence on Islamic medicine and Medieval European medicine until many of their finding eventually became obsolete from the 14th century onwards.

Unani Medicine (/juːˈnɑːni/; Yūnānī in Arabic, Hindustani and Persian), also spelled Yunani Medicine, means "Greek Medicine", and is a form of traditional medicine widely practiced in South Asia. It refers to a tradition of Graeco-Arabic medicine, which is based on the teachings of Greek physician Hippocrates, and Roman physician Galen, and developed into an elaborate medical System by Arab and Persian physicians, such as Rhazes, Avicenna (Ibn Sena), Al-Zahrawi, Ibn Nafis.

An author observed that “The fourth Umayyad Caliph, Marwan I, ordered the translation … of the famous medical treatise of Aaron of Alexandria. The translation of medical literature was in fact a principal aspect of the scientific progress that distinguished the rule of the Umayyads.”

The oldest scientific work in Arabic was a discourse on medicine, which was written by Aaron of Alexandria, a Greek Christian priest, and translated from the Syriac language then into Arabic in the year 683 by a Jewish doctor from Basra named Masarjawaih.

Immense scientific knowledge, (such as Galenic medical knowledge), fell into the hands of Muslims after their military conquest of the Christian city of Alexandria in the year 642. Muslim physicians would build upon these Greek works for their later reputation in the medical field.

== Greek fire ==
Greek fire was an incendiary weapon used by the Byzantine Empire. The Byzantines typically used it in naval battles to great effect as it could continue burning even on water. It provided a technological advantage, and was responsible for many key Byzantine military victories, most notably the salvation of Constantinople from two Arab sieges, thus securing the Empire's survival. Greek fire proper however was invented in c. 672, and is ascribed by the chronicler Theophanes to Kalliniko, an architect from Heliopolis in the former province of Phoenice, by then overrun by the Muslim conquests.

== Byzantine architecture ==
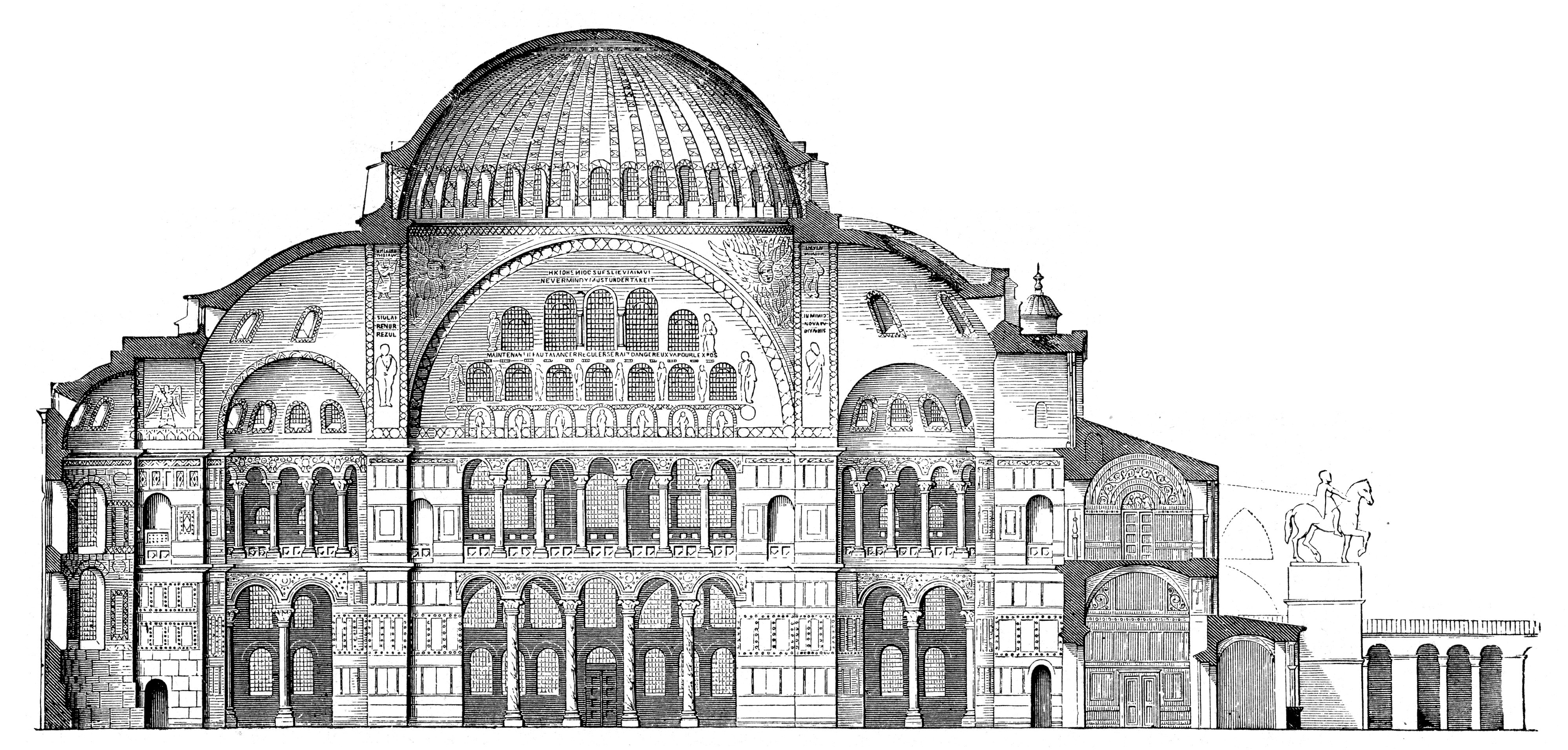
A section of the original architecture of Hagia Sophia Constantinople, today Istanbul 537 AD

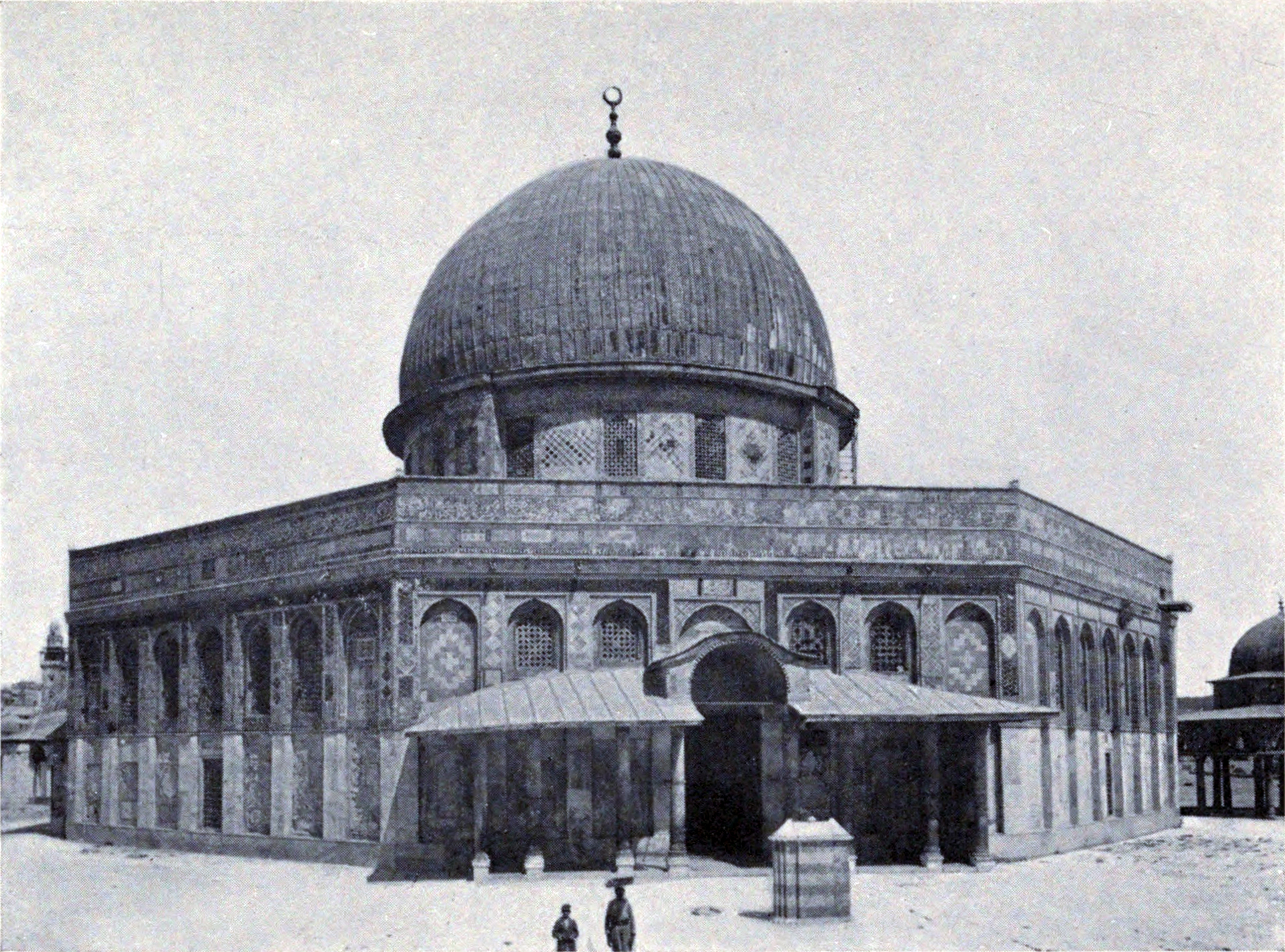
The Dome of the Rock in Jerusalem built in 691 AD

Byzantine Greek architecture in the West gave way to Romanesque and Gothic architecture. In the East it exerted a profound influence on early Islamic architecture, During the Umayyad Caliphate era (661-750), as far as the Greek impact on early Islamic architecture is concerned, the Greek artistic heritage formed a fundamental source to the new Islamic art, especially in Syria and Palestine. There are considerable Byzantine influences which can be detected in the distinctive early Islamic monuments in Syria and Palestine, as on the Dome of the Rock (691) at Jerusalem, the Umayyad Mosque (709-15) at Damascus. While the Dome of the Rock gives clear reference in plan - and partially in decoration - to Byzantine art, the plan of the Umayyad Mosque has also a remarkable similarity with the 6th- and 7th-century Christian basilicas, but it has been modified and expanded on the transversal axis and not on the normal longitudinal axis as in the Christian basilicas. This modification serves better the liturgy for the Islamic prayer. The original mihrab of the mosque is located almost in the middle of the eastern part of the qibla wall and not in its middle, a feature which can be explained by the fact that the architect might have tried to avoid the impression of a Christian apse which would result from the placement of the mihrab in the middle of the transept. The tile work, geometric patterns, multiple arches, domes, and polychrome brick and stone work that characterize Islamic and Moorish architecture were influenced by Byzantine architecture.

Caliph al-Walid I was said to have been in such desperate need of Byzantine architectural assistance that he blackmailed the Byzantine emperor by threatening to destroy churches in the Muslim lands if his request of greek artisans was not met.

Al-Muqaddasi explains that the reason behind the construction of the Umayyad mosque of Damascus was because of inspiration from Byzantine Greek Churches.

Al-Walid was divinely guided in a matter of great importance. He looked out over Syria, the land of the Christians, and saw there fine churches, such as the Church of the Holy Sepulchre and those of Lydda and Edessa, enticing in their ornamentation and great fame. So he erected for the Muslims a mosque that would divert their attention from these churches, and he made it one of the wonders of the earth. Do you not understand that when ‘Abd al-Malik saw the imposing and inspiring dome of the Church of the Holy Sepulchre, he was afraid lest it assume an equally large place in the heart of Muslims? So he built on the rock a dome which is now seen there.

=== Ottoman architecture ===
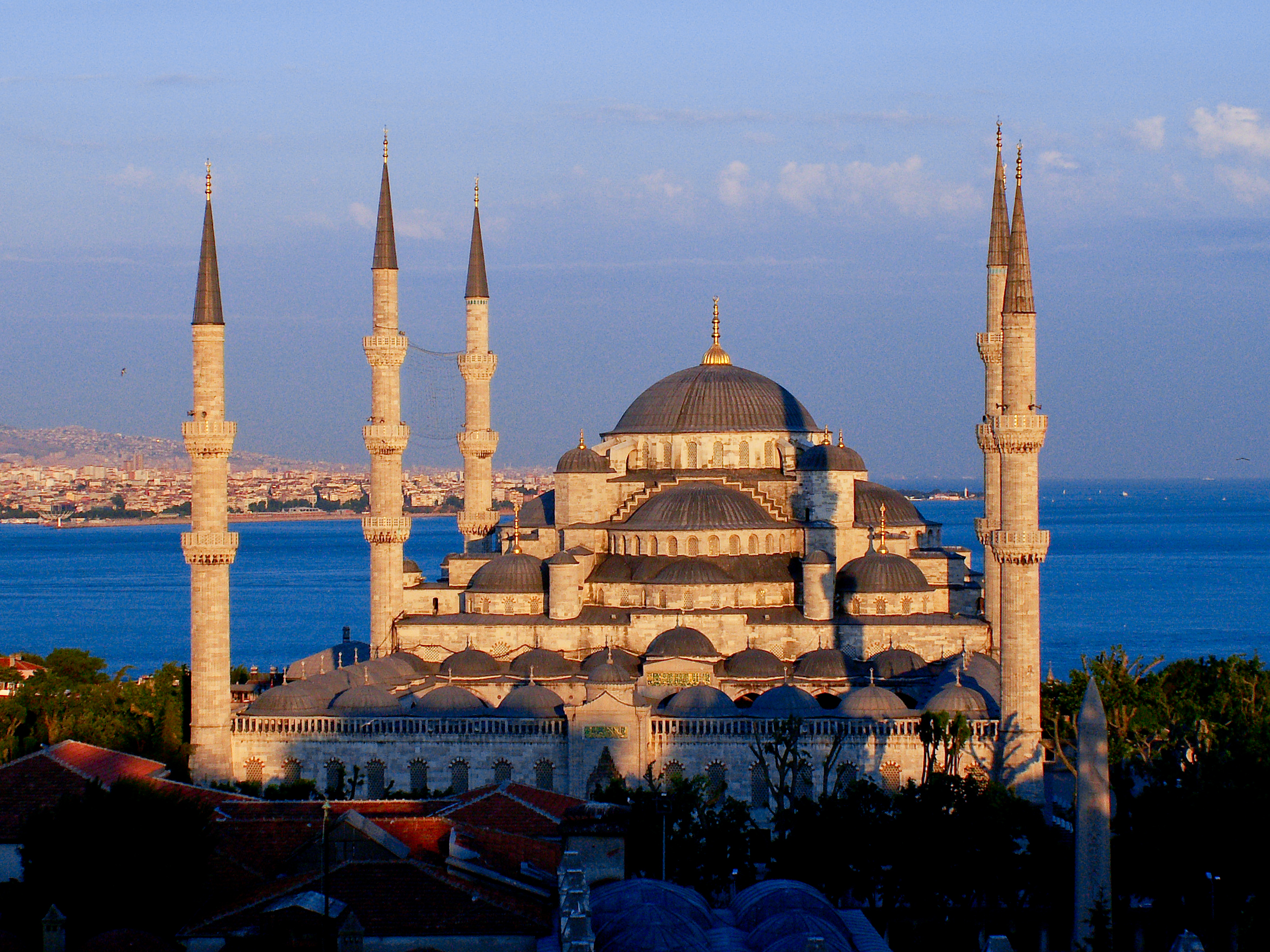
Blue Mosque in Istanbul built in 1617 AD

Ottoman architecture is the architecture of the Ottoman Empire which emerged in Bursa and Edirne in 14th and 15th centuries. The architecture of the empire developed from the earlier Anatolian Seljuk architecture and was influenced by Byzantine, Iranian and Mamluk Egyptian traditions after the conquest of Constantinople by the Ottomans. For almost 400 years Byzantine architectural artifacts such as the church of Hagia Sophia served as models for most of the Ottoman mosques.

== Byzantine art ==
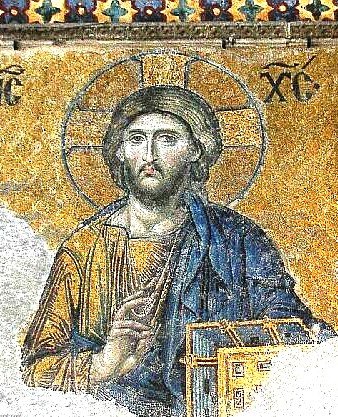
Mosaic of Christ Pantocrator from Hagia Sophia from the Deesis mosaic.

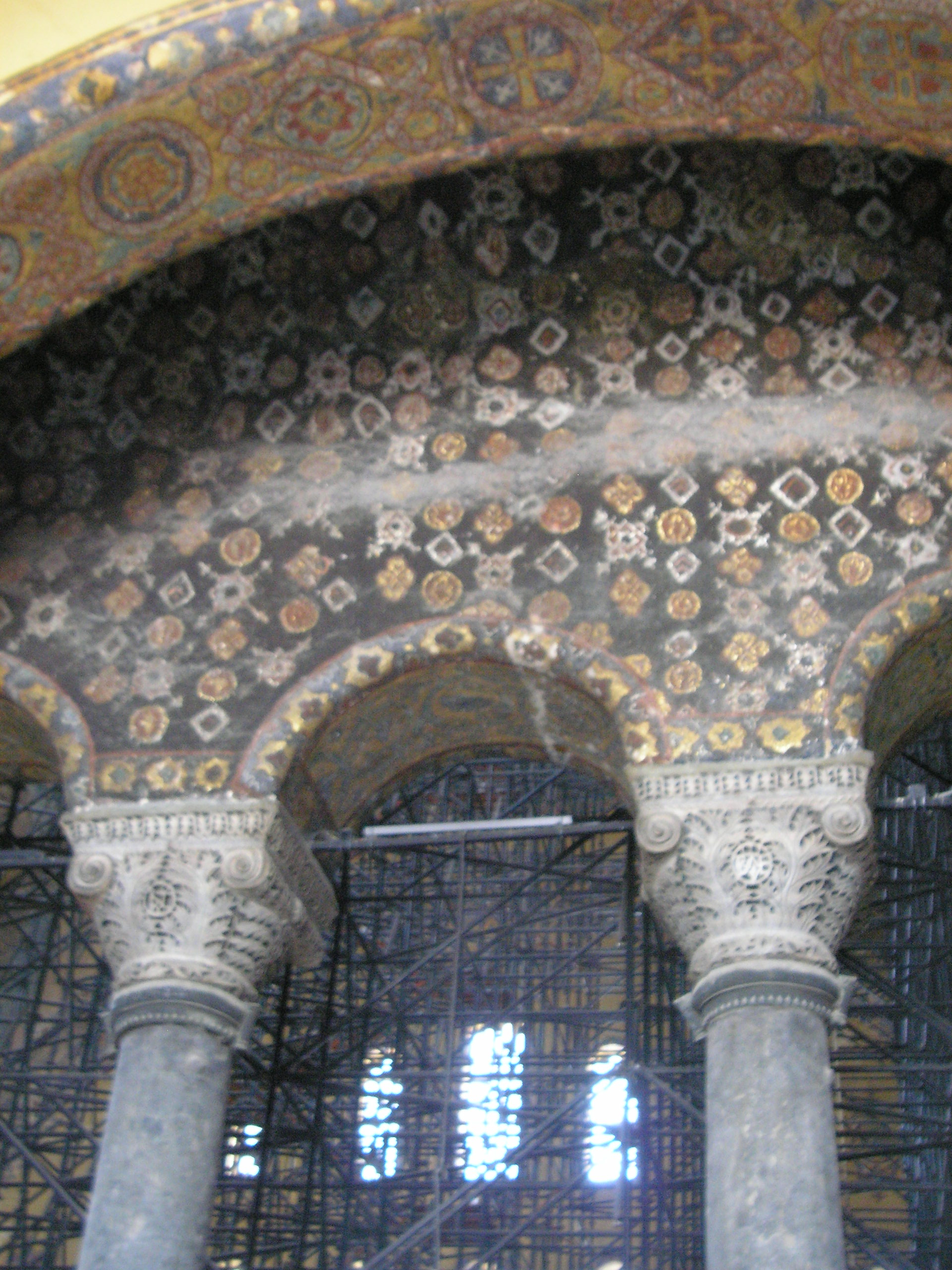
Mosaics with geometric pattern Hagia Sophia

Islamic art began with artists and craftsmen mostly trained in Byzantine styles, and though figurative content was greatly reduced, Byzantine decorative styles remained a great influence on Islamic art, and Byzantine artists continued to be imported for important works for some time, especially for mosaics. Islamic architecture used mosaic technique to decorate religious buildings and palaces after the Muslim conquests of the eastern provinces of the Byzantine Empire. In Syria and Egypt the Arabs were influenced by the great tradition of Hellenistic and Early Christian mosaic art. During the Umayyad Dynasty mosaic making remained a flourishing art form in Islamic culture and it is continued in the art of zellige and azulejo in various parts of the Arab world, although tile was to become the main Islamic form of wall decoration.

The first great religious building of Islam, the Dome of the Rock in Jerusalem, which was built between 688-692, was decorated with glass mosaics both inside and outside, by craftsmen of the Byzantine tradition. Only parts of the original interior decoration survive. The rich floral motifs follow Byzantine traditions, and are "Islamic only in the sense that the vocabulary is syncretic and does not include representation of men or animals."

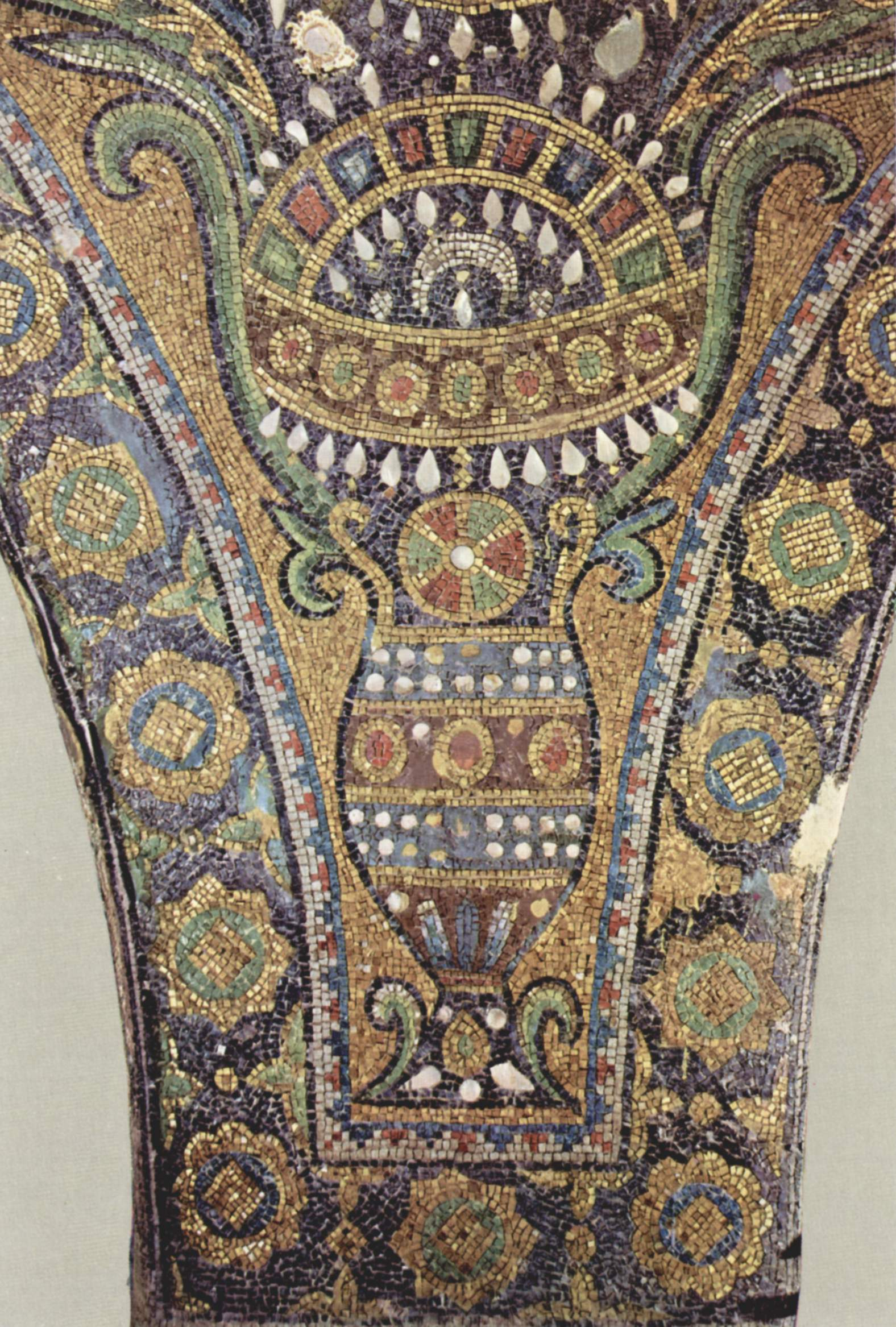
Islamic mosaics inside the Dome of the Rock in Jerusalem (c. 690)

The most important early Islamic mosaic work is the decoration of the Umayyad Mosque in Damascus, then capital of the Arab Caliphate. The mosque was built between 706 and 715. The caliph obtained 200 skilled workers from the Byzantine Emperor to decorate the building. This is evidenced by the partly Byzantine style of the decoration. The mosaics of the inner courtyard depict Paradise with beautiful trees, flowers and small hill towns and villages in the background. The mosaics include no human figures, which makes them different from the otherwise similar contemporary Byzantine works. The biggest continuous section survives under the western arcade of the courtyard, called the "Barada Panel" after the river Barada. It is thought that the mosque used to have the largest gold mosaic in the world, at over 4 m^{2}. In 1893 a fire damaged the mosque extensively, and many mosaics were lost, although some have been restored since.

According to the scholar Irfan Shahid, sources point to the influence of the Greek Byzantines and Persians in the development of music in Arabia.

Arab sources agree that the Byzantine artisians were highly skilled in all fields and left their nearest competitors far behind. The persian historian ibn al-Faqih praised Byzantine art:

The Romans are the nation most skilled in painting...Their artists paint human beings without omitting a single detail, for the Roman painter is not satisfied with a painting until he has transformed the figure into a youth, a mature man, or a dotard; he next makes his subject handsome and charming and then mirthful or lachrymose. In his painting the artist even manages to distinguish between a sarcastic smile and a shy one and between gaiety and the laughter of the delirious.

The Persian Habash al-Hasib al-Marwazi states that "the Rūm are indisputable masters in al-ṣanā"i" al-mihaniyya (the applied arts)"

The famous scholar Abu Ya'la ibn al-Farra' observed that the Byzantines "relinquished warfare to become a settled people, Landowners who raise sheep cows and horses. But above all they are craftsmen."

The high value placed on Byzantine Brocades in the Islamic world is attested to in al-Tha'alibi's book "Laṭāʼif al-maʻārif" in which Abu Dulaf al-Khazraji prays for godsends, including Byzantine Brocades. The theologian al-Jahiz says that "In the Domains of construction, carpentry, craftsmanship, and turnery, the Byzantines have no equal."

== Greek astronomy ==
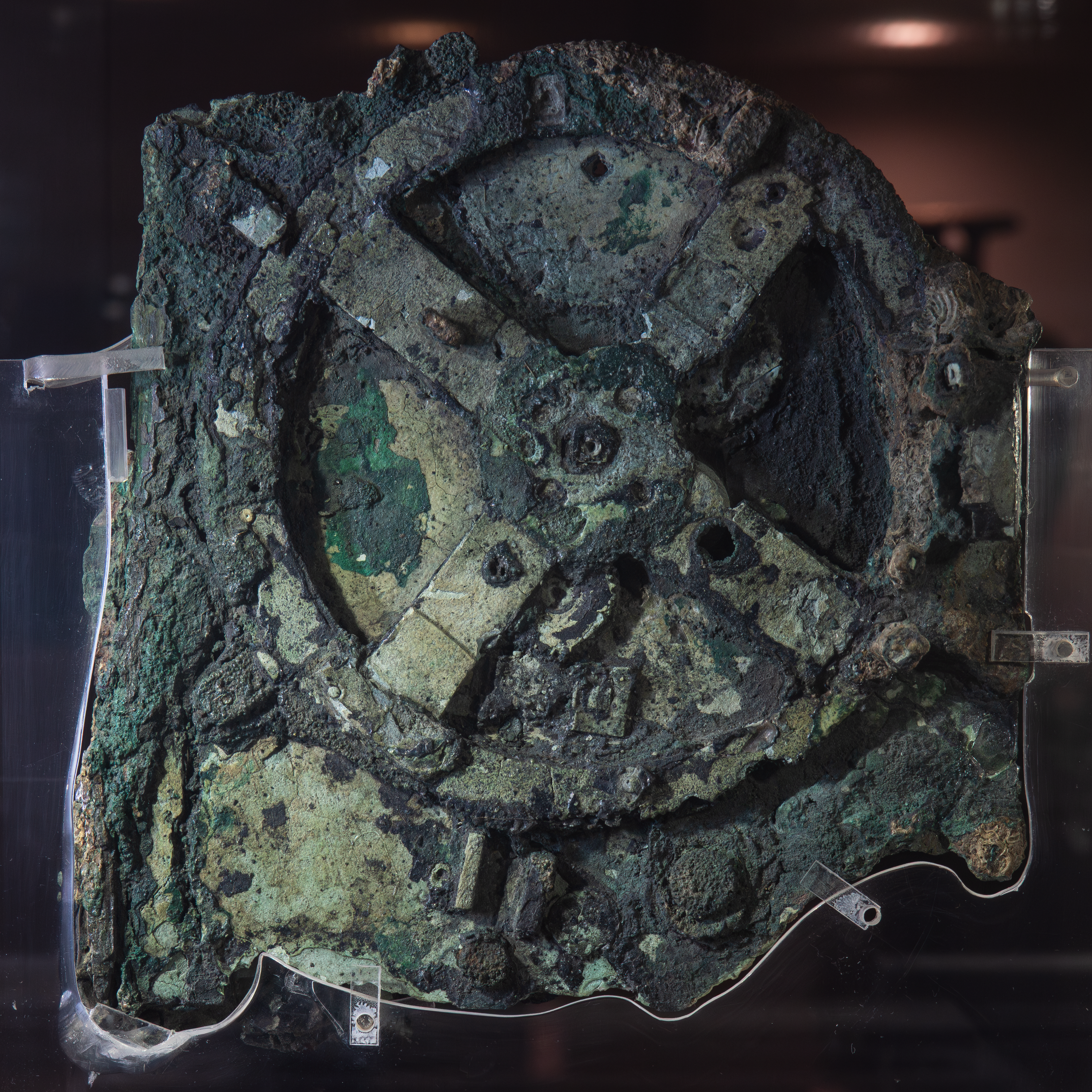
The Antikythera Mechanism was an analog computer from 150–100 BC designed to calculate the positions of astronomical objects.

Greek astronomy is astronomy written in the Greek language in classical antiquity. Greek astronomy is understood to include the ancient Greek, Hellenistic, Greco-Roman, and Late Antiquity eras. It is not limited geographically to Greece or to ethnic Greeks, as the Greek language had become the language of scholarship throughout the Hellenistic world following the conquests of Alexander. This phase of Greek astronomy is also known as Hellenistic astronomy, while the pre-Hellenistic phase is known as Classical Greek astronomy. During the Hellenistic and Roman periods, much of the Greek and non-Greek astronomers working in the Greek tradition studied at the Musaeum and the Library of Alexandria in Ptolemaic Egypt. The development of astronomy by the Greek and Hellenistic astronomers is considered by historians to be a major phase in the history of astronomy. Greek astronomy is characterized from the start by seeking a rational, physical explanation for celestial phenomena. Most of the constellations of the northern hemisphere derive from Greek astronomy, as are the names of all planets and moons and all stars in the Bayer designation. It was influenced by Babylonian and, to a lesser extent, Egyptian astronomy; in turn, it influenced Indian, Arabic-Islamic and Western European astronomy.

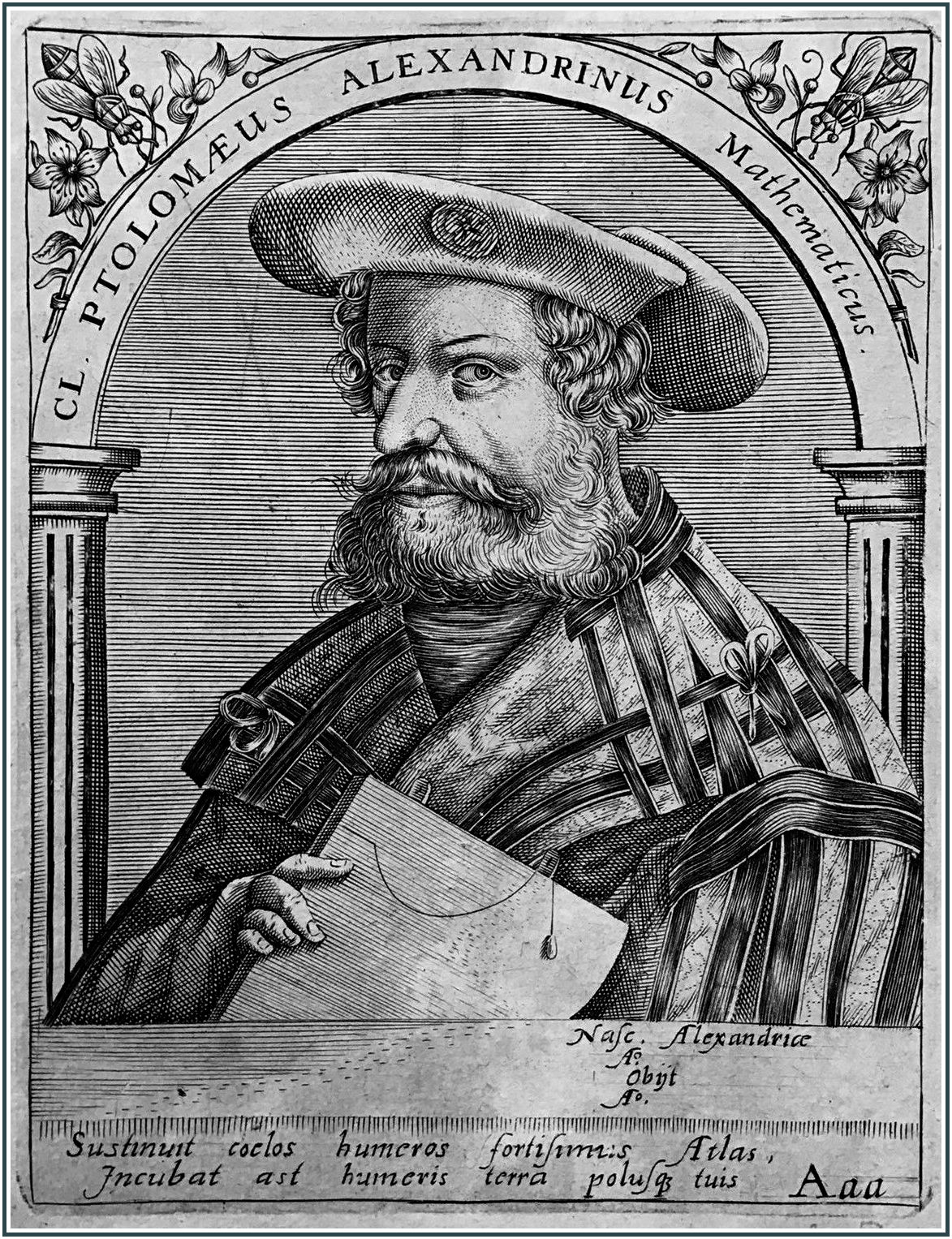
Ptolemy's Almagest became an authoritative work for many centuries.

Many of the proper names for individual stars within the constellations are Arabic (modern designation is the Bayer designation by the German Johann Bayer from 1603, it is a stellar designation in which a specific star is identified by a Greek letter, followed by the genitive form of its parent constellation's Latin name. The original list of Bayer designations contained 1,564 stars), before the Arabian names, there were Greek names of the stars.

The Greek astronomer Hipparchus 190 BC – c. 120 BC work, were later made into several scientific texts by the Greek Claudius Ptolemy’s called the Almagest, which contained the original Greek and Latin names for stars, It contain a star catalogue of 1022 stars, described by their positions in the constellations, In the 9th century it was adopted by the Arabs and translated from the original Greek and Latin into Arabic. For example, the Arabs translated Opisthen (Οπισθεν "after" or "following"^{Greek}) or Opiso (Οπισω "to follow after" ^{Greek}), one of the original Greek names for the brightest star in Taurus, as Aldebaran (الدبران), which means "the Follower" in Arabic, because the star always follows behind the Pleiades as both move across the sky. In all, there are three major names for the brightest star in Taurus; the proper name Aldebaran and the scientific names, Alpha Taurind and 87 Tauri. Any of these three names can be used for the brightest star in Taurus but present day astronomers prefer to use the latter two scientific names.

Due to their enormous popularity, a remnant of bright stars retained their original Greek or Latin names, surviving the mass invasion of Arabic names. Examples include Sirius (Greek for "searing" or "scorching"), Arcturus (Greek for "Guardian of the Bear"), Capella (Latin for "Little She-goat"), and Spica (Latin for "Ear of Grain"). Examples of Chinese and Hindu names include Koo She (Chinese for "Bow and Arrow") and Ashlesha (Vedic-Hindu for "The Embracing One"). There are also contemporary proper names given to some stars, many of which refer to accomplished astronomers, deceased astronauts and English titles. For example, Gamma Velorum is named Regor, which is "Roger" spelled backwards; the name honors Astronaut Roger B. Chaffee, who died in the Apollo 1 tragedy. Other contemporary names include The Persian (Alpha Indi) and The Head of Hydrus (Alpha Hydri), Herschel's Garnet Star (Mu Cephei), Barnard's Star, etc.

== Humanism and Renaissance ==
During the 12th century the Byzantines provided their model of early humanism as a renaissance of interest in classical authors. In Eustathius of Thessalonica Byzantine humanism found its most characteristic expression. During the 13th and 14th centuries, a period of intense creative activity, Byzantine humanism approached its zenith, and manifested a striking analogy to the contemporaneous Italian humanism. Byzantine humanism believed in the vitality of classical civilization, and of its sciences, and its proponents occupied themselves with scientific sciences.

Despite the political, and military decline of these last two centuries, the Empire saw a flourishing of science and literature, often described as the "Palaeologean" or "Last Byzantine Renaissance". Some of this era's most eminent representatives are: Maximus Planudes, Manuel Moschopulus, Demetrius Triclinius and Thomas Magister. The Academy at Trebizond, highly influenced by Persian sciences, became a renowned center for the study of astronomy, and other mathematical sciences, and medicine attracted the interest of almost all scholars. In the final century of the Empire Byzantine grammarians were those principally responsible for carrying in person, and in writing ancient Greek grammatical, and literary studies to early Renaissance Italy, and among them Manuel Chrysoloras was involved over the never achieved union of the Churches.

== Byzantine and Islamic science ==
During the Middle Ages, there was frequently an exchange of works between Byzantine and Islamic science. The Byzantine Empire initially provided the medieval Islamic world with Ancient and early Medieval Greek texts on astronomy, mathematics and philosophy for translation into Arabic as the Byzantine Empire was the leading center of scientific scholarship in the region at the beginning of the Middle Ages. Later as the Caliphate and other medieval Islamic cultures became the leading centers of scientific knowledge, Byzantine scientists such as Gregory Choniades, who had visited the famous Maragheh observatory, translated books on Islamic astronomy, mathematics and science into Medieval Greek, including for example the works of Ja'far ibn Muhammad Abu Ma'shar al-Balkhi, Ibn Yunus, Al-Khazini (who was of Byzantine Greek descent but raised in a Persian culture), Muhammad ibn Mūsā al-Khwārizmī and Nasīr al-Dīn al-Tūsī (such as the Zij-i Ilkhani and other Zij treatises) among others.

There were also some Byzantine scientists who used Arabic transliterations to describe certain scientific concepts instead of the equivalent Ancient Greek terms (such as the use of the Arabic talei instead of the Ancient Greek horoscopus). Byzantine science thus played an important role in not only transmitting ancient Greek knowledge to Western Europe and the Islamic world, but in also transmitting Arabic knowledge to Western Europe, such as the transmission of the Tusi-couple, which later appeared in the work of Nicolaus Copernicus. Byzantine scientists also became acquainted with Sassanid and Indian astronomy through citations in some Arabic works.
