= Giulio Borgarucci =

Italian physician

Giulio Borgarucci (fl. 1564–1579; died c. 1581) was an Italian court physician who immigrated to England and became physician to the royal household.

== Life ==
Giulio Borgarucci, born in Cantiano, was one of four sons of Carlo Borgarucci. Of his brothers, the eldest, Borgaruccio, edited several works of history and science; Prospero became professor of anatomy at Padua in January 1564, and obtained great reputation by his writings; and Giulio his elder brother, who was a physician, came to England as a Protestant refugee, and was a member of the Italian branch of the Strangers' Church in London, under the ministry of Girolamo Jerlito.

In 1563, when London was visited by the plague, Borgrucci treated the epidemic by bleeding. His brother Bernardino, a juris-consult, was also then in London. Prospero also came to London during the plague, and learned from Giulio the use of a ball (pomo) compounded of balsamic substances, to be held in the hand, that its odour might counteract the effects of foul air. Borgarucci was admitted a member of the College of Physicians, and on 2 July 1572 was incorporated MD in the University of Cambridge. He was physician to the Earl of Leicester, who is said to have made evil use of his knowledge of poisons.

By patent of 21 September 1573 he was made physician to the royal household for life, with an honorarium of 50l. per annum. The last trace of him is his letter of 21 February 1578–9 to Lord Burghley (in whose house the Italian church originally assembled), asking the grant of a lease from the Crown of the reversion of the parsonage of Middlewich, Cheshire. He is supposed to have died about 1581, and was succeeded as court physician by Roderigo Lopez.

Borgarucci was married, and in October 1573 he wrote to Lord Burghley complaining that Sir William Cordell, Master of the Rolls, had for five months detained his wife from him in his house, nourishing her in his popish superstitions. The lady was not anxious to return, and a commission of delegates was appointed to inquire whether she was really Borgarucci's wife or the wife of another person. The case lasted several years; ultimately Borgarucci seems to have established his conjugal rights. From the fact that Archbishop Grindal took sides against Borgarucci, it is perhaps not unreasonable to suppose that the court physician was one of those who regarded as "popish superstitions" some of the positions of Anglican orthodoxy. He wrote a short commendatory epistle in Latin, following the Proeme to John Banister's The Historie of Man, sucked from the sappe of the most approved Anathomistes, 1578, fol.

== Bibliography ==
- Gordon, Alexander (1886). "Borgarucci, Giulio" . In Stephen, Leslie (ed.). Dictionary of National Biography. Vol. 5. London: Smith, Elder & Co. p. 396.
