= Masarjawaih =

Māsarjawaih (Arabic: ماسرجويه) was one of the earliest Jewish physicians of Persian origin, and the earliest translator from the Syriac; he lived in Basra about 683 (Anno Hegirae 64). His name, distorted, has been transmitted in European sources; it has not yet been satisfactorily explained. Neuda (in "Orient, Lit." vi. 132) compares the name "Masarjawaih" with the Hebrew proper name "Mesharsheya"; but the ending "-waih" points to a Persian origin. The form "Masarjis" has been compared with the Christian proper name "Mar Serjis"; but it is not known that Masarjis embraced either Christianity or Islam.

Masarjawaih's son, who also was a translator, and was the author of two treatises (on colors and on foods), was called "'Isa", that is, "Jesus", a name that indicates that this son had converted to Christianity.

Masarjawaih translated the medical Pandects of the archdeacon or presbyter Aaron of Alexandria (fl. c. 610–641) from the Syriac into Arabic and added to the thirty chapters of this translation two of his own. This is believed to be the first scientific book to have been translated into Arabic. He also wrote in Arabic two treatises, "The Virtues of Foods, Their Advantage and Their Disadvantage", and "The Virtues of the Medicinal Plants, Their Advantage and Their Disadvantage". None of these three writings has been preserved. Their contents, however, are known to a certain extent by quotations. How much Masarjawaih added to the translation of Aaron's pandects can hardly be decided, as the works themselves are preserved in fragments only.

== Resources ==
- Gottheil, Richard and Max Schloessinger. "Masarjawaih". Jewish Encyclopedia. Funk and Wagnalls, 1901–1906; which gives the following bibliography:

- Steinschneider, in Z. D. M. G. liii. 428 et seq.;
- idem, Die Arabische Literatur, § 16, pp. 13 et seq. G. M. Sc.

== See also ==
- Faraj ben Salim
