= William Clowes the younger =

English surgeon (1582–1648)

- Born: 1582
- Died: 1648 (aged 65–66)
- Occupation: Surgeon
- Parent: William Clowes the elder

William Clowes the younger (1582–1648) was an English surgeon.

== Biography ==
Clowes was the son of William Clowes the elder, surgeon to Queen Elizabeth, studied his art under his father. He was admitted a member of the Barber-Surgeons' Company 22 January 1605. In 1616 he was surgeon to the Prince of Wales (Devon, Issues of Exchequer), and became surgeon to Charles I on his accession. In 1625 he was chosen renter warden of his company, but protested against a king's surgeon being appointed to so low an office, and declined to serve. On 21 August 1626, being then sergeant surgeon to the king, he was elected master of the Barber-Surgeons, and on 16 August 1638 he was a second time elected master. It was the duty of the king's sergeant surgeon to examine all persons brought to be cured by the royal touch (Douglas, The Criterion, ed. 1820, p. 479), and in this capacity Clowes complained of one Leverett, a gardener, who took on himself to cure the king's evil. Leverett was brought before the lords at the Star-chamber 20 October 1637, and Clowes was by them directed to lay the matter before the College of Physicians. Leverett accordingly appeared at the college 3 November 1637, and stated that he cured, by touch alone, king's evil, dropsy, fevers, agues, internal diseases, and external sores, and that, though he did not lay much stress on it, he was a seventh son. A patient with a strumous knee-joint and other cases were given him to experiment on, and on his failure Clowes presented, 28 November 1637, a memorial recounting that Leverett slighted his majesty's sacred gift of healing, enticed great lords and ladies to buy the sheets he had slept in, and deluded the sick with false hopes. He produced certificates from Thomas Clowes and two other surgeons in the city as to Leverett's impostures, and finally, by an extract from the register of St. Clement, Eastcheap, proved that James Leverett was a fourth and not a seventh son, and that his father had but six sons in all. The college thereupon reported to the lords that Leverett was an impostor and deceiver. The last appearance of Clowes in the Barber-Surgeons' Company was on 14 September 1648, and he died a few months later.
