= Numisianus =

Numisianus, (Greek: Νουμισιανός; 2nd century) an eminent Greek physician at Corinth, whose lectures Galen attended c. 150, having gone to Corinth for that very reason. He was, according to Galen, the most celebrated of all the pupils of Quintus, and one of the tutors to Pelops, and distinguished himself especially by his anatomical knowledge. He wrote a commentary on the Aphorisms of Hippocrates, which appears to have been well thought of in Galen's time.
