= Roderigo Lopes =

Portuguese physician (c.1517–1594)

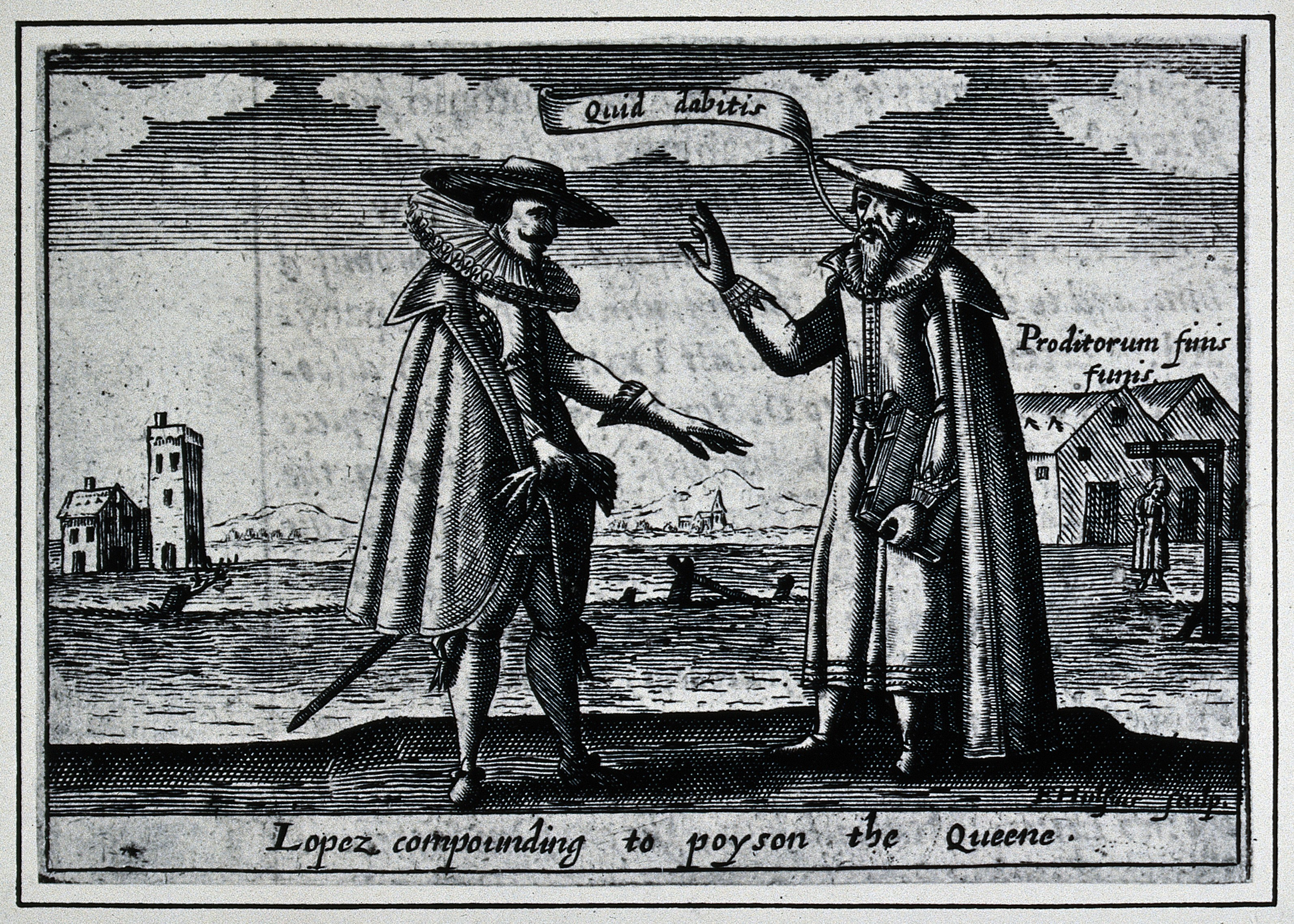
Lopes (right) speaking with a Spaniard (engraving by Esaias van Hulsen)

Roderigo Lopes (Note: Also called Ruy Lopes, Ruy Lopez, Roderigo Lopus, Ruy Lopus, Roger Lopez and Rodrigo Lopes; also referred to as Roderigo Lopez and Rodrigo Lopez) (c. 1517 – 7 June 1594) was a Portuguese physician who served as a physician-in-chief to Queen Elizabeth I of England from 1581 until his death by execution, having been found guilty of plotting to poison her. A Portuguese converso or New Christian of Jewish ancestry, he is the only royal doctor in English history to have been executed, and may have inspired the character of Shylock in Shakespeare's The Merchant of Venice, which was written within four years of his death.

The son of a Portuguese royal physician of Jewish descent, Lopes was raised a Catholic and educated at the University of Coimbra. Amid the Portuguese Inquisition he was accused of secretly practising Judaism, and compelled to leave the country. He settled in London in 1559, joined the Church of England and became house physician at St Bartholomew's Hospital. Gaining a reputation as a careful and skilled physician, he acquired several powerful clients, including the Earl of Leicester and Sir Francis Walsingham, and eventually the Queen of England herself.

The Earl of Essex accused Lopes of conspiring to poison the Queen in January 1594. Insisting on his innocence, the doctor was convicted of high treason in February and hanged, drawn and quartered in June, reportedly after averring from the scaffold that "he loved the Queen as well as he loved Jesus Christ"—a statement that, from a man of Jewish background, prompted mocking laughter from the crowd. Elizabeth's three-month delay signing Lopes's death warrant is sometimes interpreted as evidence that she doubted the case against him. In any case she returned almost all of his estate to his widow and children.

== Early life and family ==
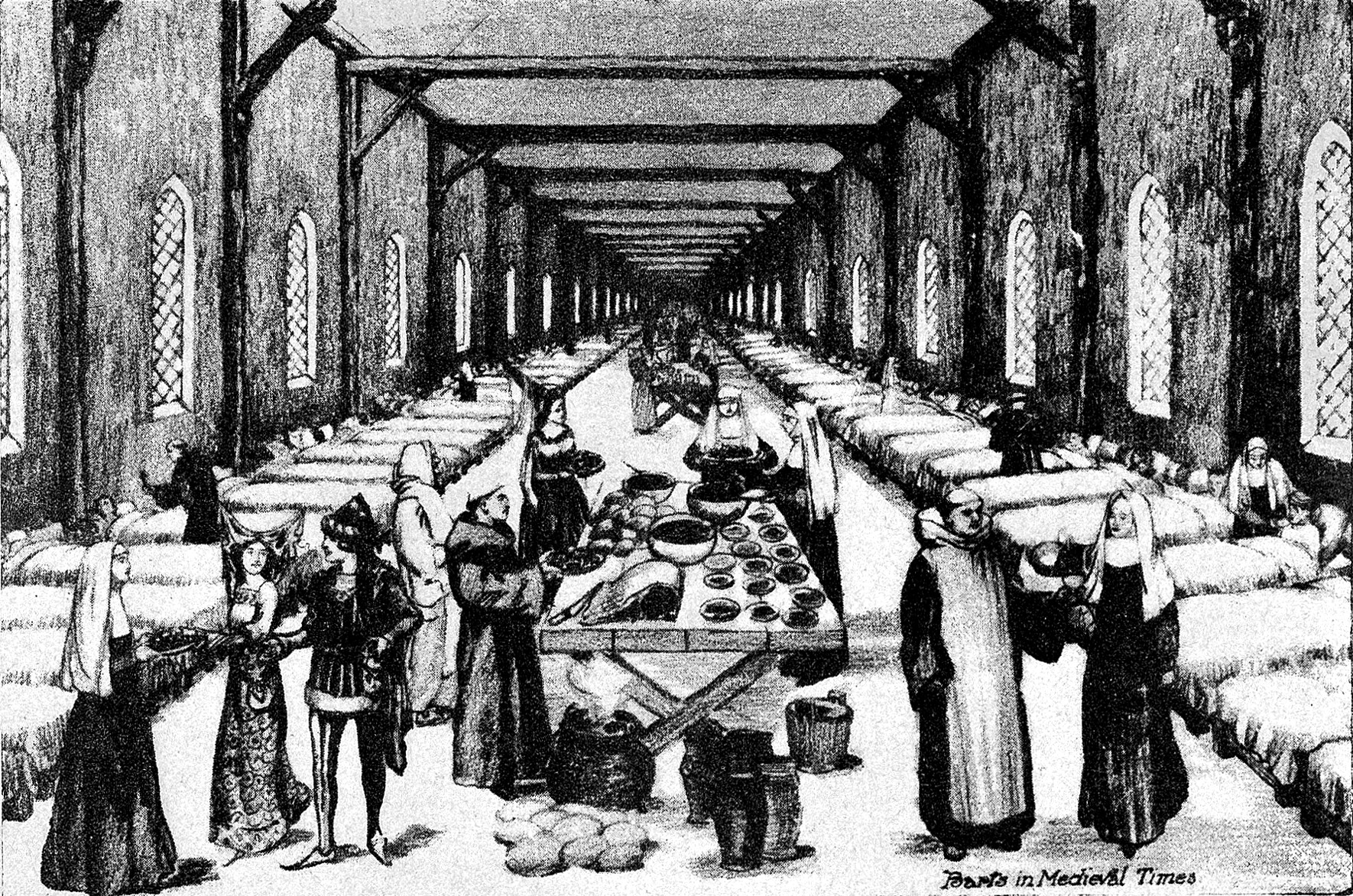
A depiction of St Bartholomew's Hospital in the Medieval period

Lopes was born in Crato, Portugal into a family of Jewish origin around 1517. His father, António Lopes, was physician to King John III of Portugal, and had been baptised into the Roman Catholic Church under coercion in 1497. Lopes was baptised and raised in the Catholic faith as a converso or New Christian, and educated at the University of Coimbra. He received a BA degree under the name Ruy Lopes on 7 February 1540, then an MA on 4 December 1541; he enrolled for a medical course on 23 December that year. Records do not survive regarding his doctorate, but according to his biographer Edgar Samuel it is probable that he received it in 1544.

Amid the Portuguese Inquisition, Lopes was alleged to be a Crypto-Jew or marrano—one of Jewish descent who professed the Christian faith, but secretly adhered to the Judaism of his ancestors—and was compelled to leave Portugal. He settled in England in 1559, anglicising his first name as "Roger", and successfully resumed his practice as a doctor in London. He joined the Church of England. He soon became the house physician at St Bartholomew's Hospital in Smithfield. A colleague there, the surgeon William Clowes, noted in 1591 that "Lopes showed himself to be both careful and very skilful ... in his counsel in dieting, purging and bleeding."

Around 1563 Lopes married Sarah Anes (b. 1550), the eldest daughter of another New Christian refugee from the Portuguese Inquisition, the merchant Dunstan Anes, who had settled in London in 1540. According to Samuel, both the Anes and Lopes households secretly practised Judaism, which was then illegal in England, while outwardly conforming as Anglicans. Other scholars are ambivalent on the matter; Lopes would always insist that he was a Christian. Roderigo and Sarah had four sons and two daughters, of whom at least the eldest five—Ellyn (Elinor), Ambrose, Douglas, William and Ann—were baptised within the hospital precincts at St Bartholomew-the-Less between 1564 and 1579. (Note: No record survives of the birth or baptism of the youngest child, Anthony, in relevant parish documents. His age of 14 or 15 in 1596 indicates that he was born around 1581.) Lopes's brother Lewis lived with them in Holborn; a second brother, Diego Lopes Aleman, became a merchant in Antwerp and Venice.

== Royal physician ==
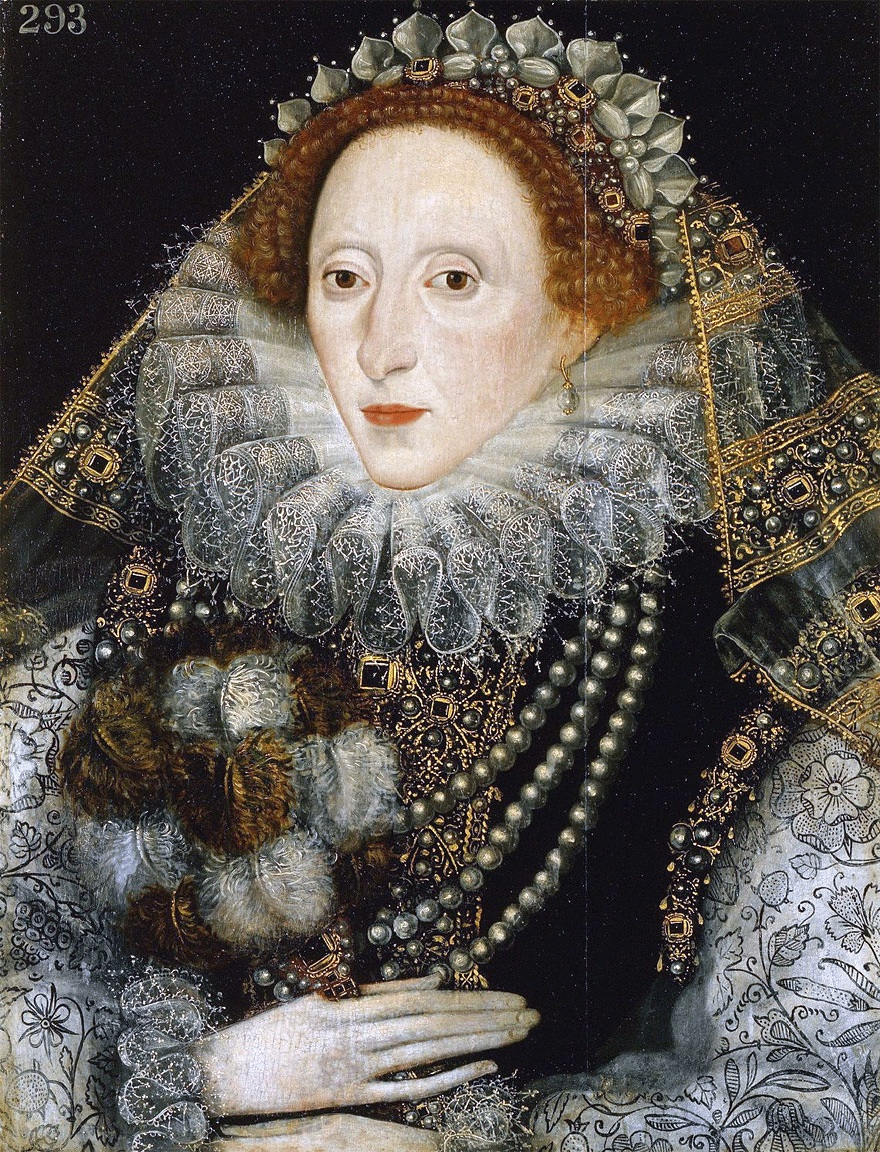
Queen Elizabeth I of England, to whom Lopes was physician from 1581

Lopes developed a large practice among powerful people, including Robert Dudley, Earl of Leicester, and the principal secretary Sir Francis Walsingham, and in 1581 he was made physician-in-chief to Queen Elizabeth I of England and her household, with a life pension of £50 per year. In June 1584, Elizabeth granted him a monopoly on the importation of aniseed and sumac to England for ten years; this was renewed in January 1593. In 1588 he was given land and tithes in Worcestershire belonging to the Bishop of Worcester Edmund Freke. Gabriel Harvey, an English scholar of the era, remarked on Lopes's rise on the title page of a book he owned, Judaeorum Medicastrorum calumnias:

Doctor Lopus, the Queenes physitian, is descended of Jewes: but himselfe A Christian, & Portugall. He none of the learnedest, or expertest physitians in ye Court: but one, that maketh as great account of himself, as the best: & by a kind of Jewish practis, hath growen to much wealth, & sum reputation: aswell with ye Queen herselfe as with sum of ye greatest Lordes, & Ladyes.

There were sections of English society at the time that believed there to be a plot, orchestrated by Catholics and carried out by Jewish physicians, to poison patients. Converso doctors in Iberia were similarly often accused of murdering their patients or attempting to poison them. In 1584, an anonymous Catholic pamphlet denouncing the Earl of Leicester suggested that "Lopes the Jewe" was one of the earl's agents "for poysoning & for the arte of destroying children in women's bellies".

Fluent in five languages, Lopes was involved in diplomatic intrigue, as many Christians of Jewish origin were at this time. Amid England's war with Spain in the 1580s, Lopes became an important member of a circle of Portuguese exiles in England, and the Queen's intermediary with the Portuguese pretender Dom António, Prior of Crato, who was staying near Windsor Castle. Lopes supported Dom António, but in 1586 one of the pretender's entourage, António da Veiga, wrote to the Spanish Ambassador in Paris, Don Bernardino de Mendoza, claiming that he could persuade Lopes to poison Dom António. The Spanish did not act on this idea.

In 1590, Lopes approached Mendoza, possibly on Walsingham's behalf, with the intention of opening peace negotiations. The Spanish gave Manuel de Andrada, Lopes's intermediary, a jewelled ring worth £100 as a gift for Lopes's daughter. After Walsingham's death in 1591, Lopes continued exchanging letters with Spanish officials without the English government's knowledge or authority. There is no surviving evidence to suggest that Lopes conspired against England or Elizabeth personally, but these Spanish connections would come back to punish him—according to Samuel, "Lopes had acted stupidly and dishonestly".

== Trial and execution ==
By the early 1590s, Lopes was wealthy and generally respected. He owned a comfortable house in Holborn and had his youngest son Anthony enrolled at Winchester College. He incurred the fury of one of his former patients, Queen Elizabeth's favourite Robert Devereux, Earl of Essex, when he described to Dom António and the Spanish statesman Antonio Pérez occasions on which he had treated Essex for venereal diseases. Learning of this from Pérez, Essex began to assemble evidence implicating Lopes as a fifth columnist in the pay of King Philip II of Spain. The Lord High Treasurer Lord Burghley initially thought Essex's allegations against Lopes absurd. The Queen herself also rebuked Essex.

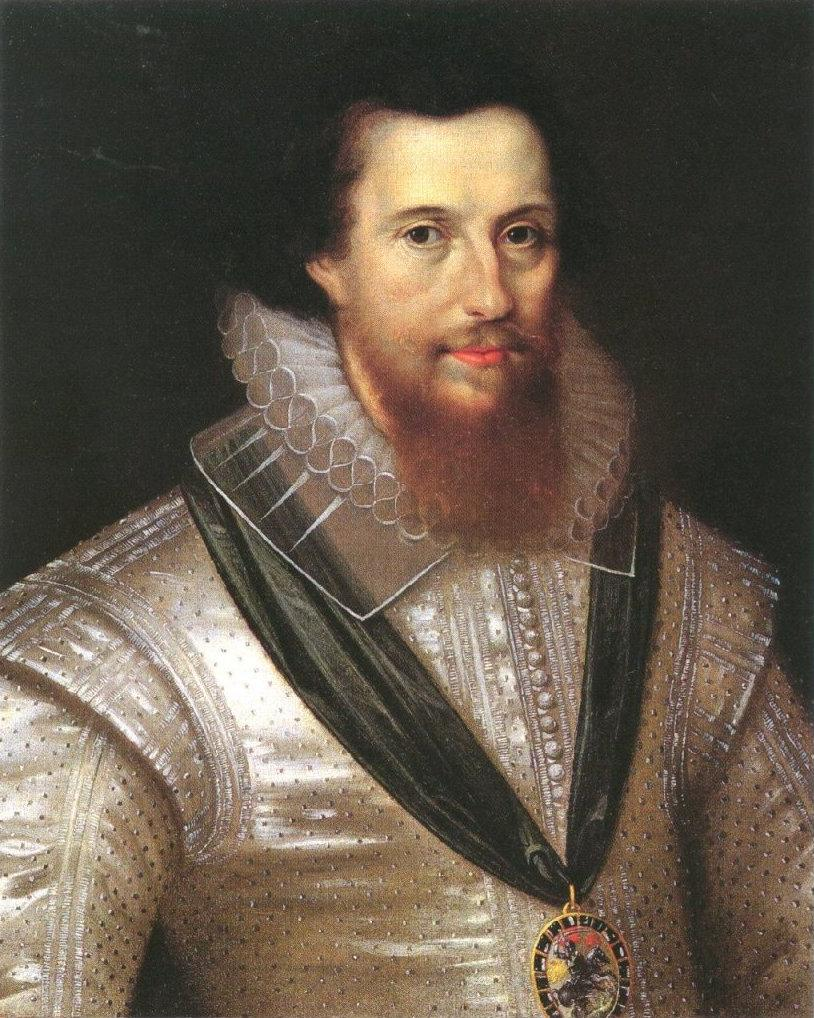
Robert Devereux, Earl of Essex, a major figure in Lopes's downfall

Late in 1593, Essex discovered a secret correspondence between Estevão Ferreira da Gama, one of Dom António's former supporters, and officials in the Spanish Netherlands—and had a messenger, Manuel Luis Tinoco, arrested. Lopes's courier Gomez d'Avila, a London-based Portuguese New Christian, was also arrested. Both implicated Lopes during interrogation. On 28 January 1594 Essex wrote to Anthony Bacon of "a most dangerous and desperate treason", the target of which was Queen Elizabeth: "The executioner should have been Dr Lopus. The manner by poison." Parallels were drawn with a letter written by Andrada to Burghley in 1591, in which reference was made to a plot whereby the King of Spain would deploy "three Portuguese to kill her Majesty and three more to kill the King of France". Tinoco was tortured and Ferreira da Gama threatened with torture until they confessed along the lines Essex suspected; Ferreira da Gama, asked if Lopes might have been willing to poison the Queen, replied in the affirmative. Lopes was arrested and held first at Essex House, then the Tower of London. He confessed when threatened with torture, but promptly recanted this statement.

Revelations regarding Lopes's secret correspondence with Spanish officials did not help his case, particularly when it emerged that he had given the Spanish information about the English court and apparently donated money to a secret synagogue in Antwerp. Burghley and the spymaster William Wade were soon "ready to believe the worst", to quote Samuel. Lopes, Ferreira da Gama and Tinoco were tried by a commission headed by Essex at Guildhall on 28 February 1594. Lopes insisted that he was innocent. The prosecutor, Sir Thomas Egerton, denounced the doctor as "a perjured, murdering villain and a Jewish doctor worse than Judas himself". The three were convicted of high treason and sentenced to death.

The Queen waited over three months before signing the death warrant; this delay is sometimes interpreted as evidence that the Queen doubted the case against her doctor. Lopes, Ferreira da Gama and Tinoco were hanged, drawn and quartered at Tyburn on 7 June 1594. Lopes insisted to the end that he was innocent and that his professed Christian faith was genuine. He fell into a state of depression, but on the scaffold gathered his resolve and, according to the 16th-century historian William Camden, declared that "he loved the Queen as well as he loved Jesus Christ". The crowd roared with derision and laughter, taking this, from a man of Jewish background, for a thinly veiled confession.

Lopes's property was forfeited on his attainder. His widow Sarah petitioned the Queen to be allowed to keep his estate; the Queen kept the ring given to Lopes's daughter by the Spanish, but returned the rest. Elizabeth also granted £30 per year to Anthony to support him at Winchester. A letter written by the Spanish diplomat Count Gondomar to King Philip III of Spain a decade after the trial seems to indicate that Lopes and Ferreira da Gama had been unjustly convicted, and that there had been no plot involving the Portuguese doctor: "the King our master [Philip II] had never conceived nor approved such measures ... the Count of Fuentes neither received nor gave such an order, moreover it is understood that Dr Lopez never passed through his thoughts, because he was a friend of the Queen and a bad Christian." Lopes remains the only royal physician executed in English history.

== Possible literary legacy ==
Some historians and literary critics consider Lopes and his trial to have been an influence on William Shakespeare's The Merchant of Venice (written c. 1596–98), specifically as an inspiration for the play's principal antagonist Shylock, a Venetian Jewish moneylender who hates Christians. The Lopes case prompted a revival of Christopher Marlowe's play The Jew of Malta (c. 1589–90), which according to Elizabeth Lane Furdell began rehearsals in London the same day Lopes was taken to Essex House. In Marlowe's Doctor Faustus (c. 1592), there is a mention of Lopes—possibly added after Marlowe's death in 1593—comparing him to the title character. It reads: "Doctor Lopus was never such a doctor!"

== Notes and references ==
=== Online ===
- Samuel, Edgar (2004). "Lopez [Lopes], Rodrigo [Ruy, Roger] (c.1517–1594)". Oxford Dictionary of National Biography (online ed.). Oxford: Oxford University Press. doi:10.1093/ref:odnb/17011. (Subscription, Wikipedia Library access or UK public library membership required.) (subscription, Wikipedia Library access or UK public library membership required)
- Samuel, Edgar (2004). "Anes, Dunstan [formerly Gonsalvo Anes; alias Gonzalo Jorge] (c.1520–1594)". Oxford Dictionary of National Biography (online ed.). Oxford: Oxford University Press. doi:10.1093/ref:odnb/40770. (Subscription, Wikipedia Library access or UK public library membership required.) (subscription, Wikipedia Library access or UK public library membership required)

=== Bibliography ===
- Boyer, Allen D (2003). Sir Edward Coke and the Elizabethan Age. Stanford, CA: Stanford University Press. ISBN 978-0-8047-4809-4.
- Barnet, Sylvan, ed. (1970). Twentieth Century Interpretations of the Merchant of Venice: A Collection of Critical Essays. Englewood Cliffs, NJ: Prentice Hall. ISBN 978-0135771556.
- Furdell, Elizabeth Lane (2001). The Royal Doctors, 1485–1714: Medical Personnel at the Tudor and Stuart Courts. Rochester, NY: University of Rochester Press. ISBN 978-1580460514.
- Green, Dominic (2003). The Double Life of Doctor Lopez: Spies, Shakespeare and the Plot to Poison Elizabeth I. London: Century. ISBN 978-0712615396.
- Greenblatt, Stephen (2012) [2004]. Will In The World: How Shakespeare Became Shakespeare. London: Random House. ISBN 978-1-4464-4259-3.
- Griffin, Eric J (2009). English Renaissance Drama and the Specter of Spain: Ethnopoetics and Empire. Philadelphia, PA: University of Philadelphia Press. ISBN 978-0-8122-4170-9.
- Marlowe, Christopher (2007) [1991]. Keefer, Michael (ed.). Doctor Faustus. Peterborough, ON: Broadview Press. ISBN 978-1-55111-210-7.
- Marlowe, Christopher (2009). Lynch, Stephen J (ed.). The Jew of Malta, with Related Texts. Indianapolis, IN: Hackett Publishing. ISBN 978-1-60384-390-4.
- Rubenstein, William D; Jolles, Michael A; Rubenstein, Hilary L. (2011). The Palgrave Dictionary of Anglo-Jewish History. London: Palgrave Macmillan. ISBN 978-1403939104.
- Ruderman, David B (2001) [1995]. Jewish Thought and Scientific Discovery in Early Modern Europe. Detroit, MI: Wayne State University Press. ISBN 978-0814329313.
