= John Banister (anatomist) =

English anatomist, surgeon and teacher

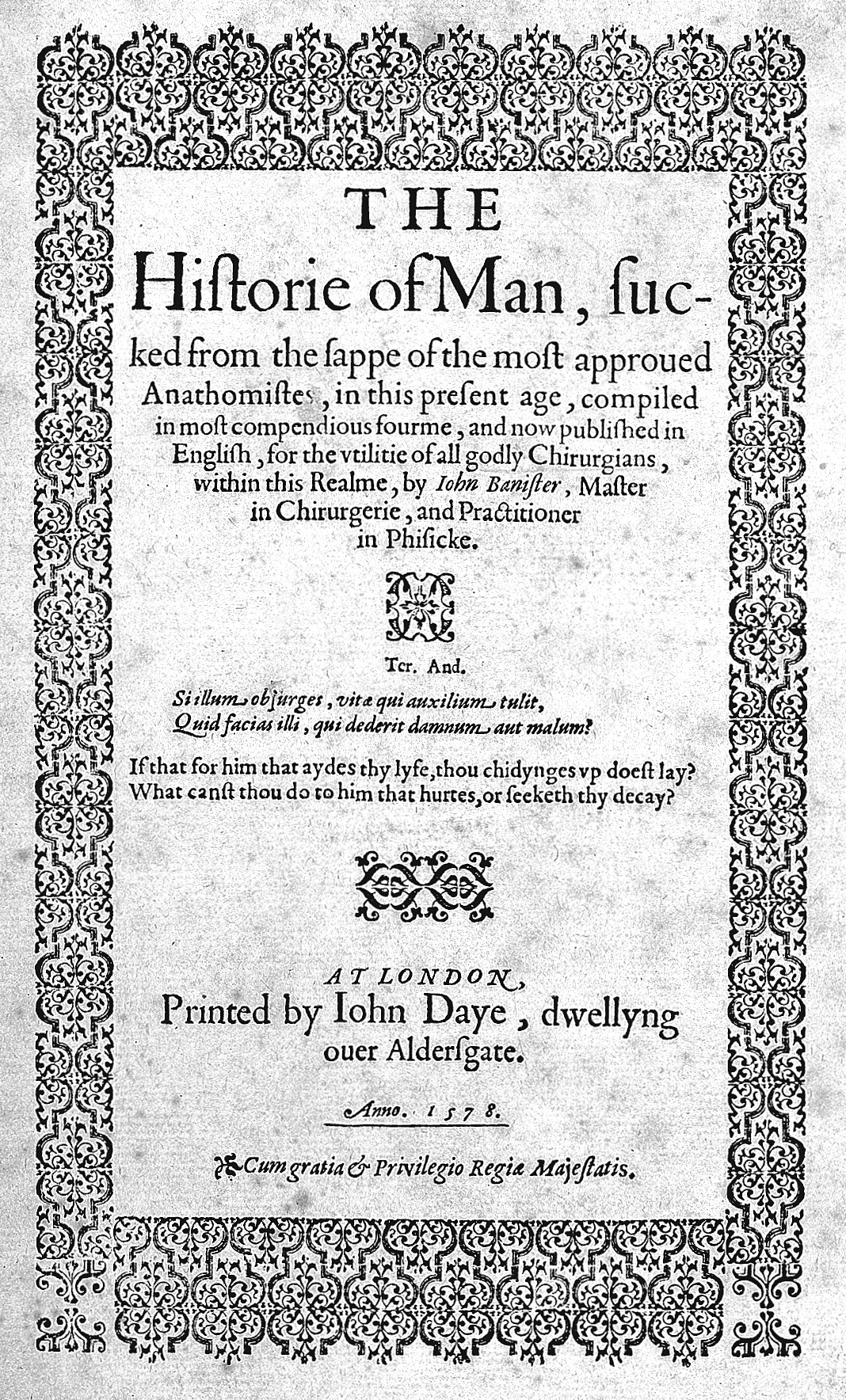
The Historie of Man, from the most approved Authorities in this Present Age, in 1578.

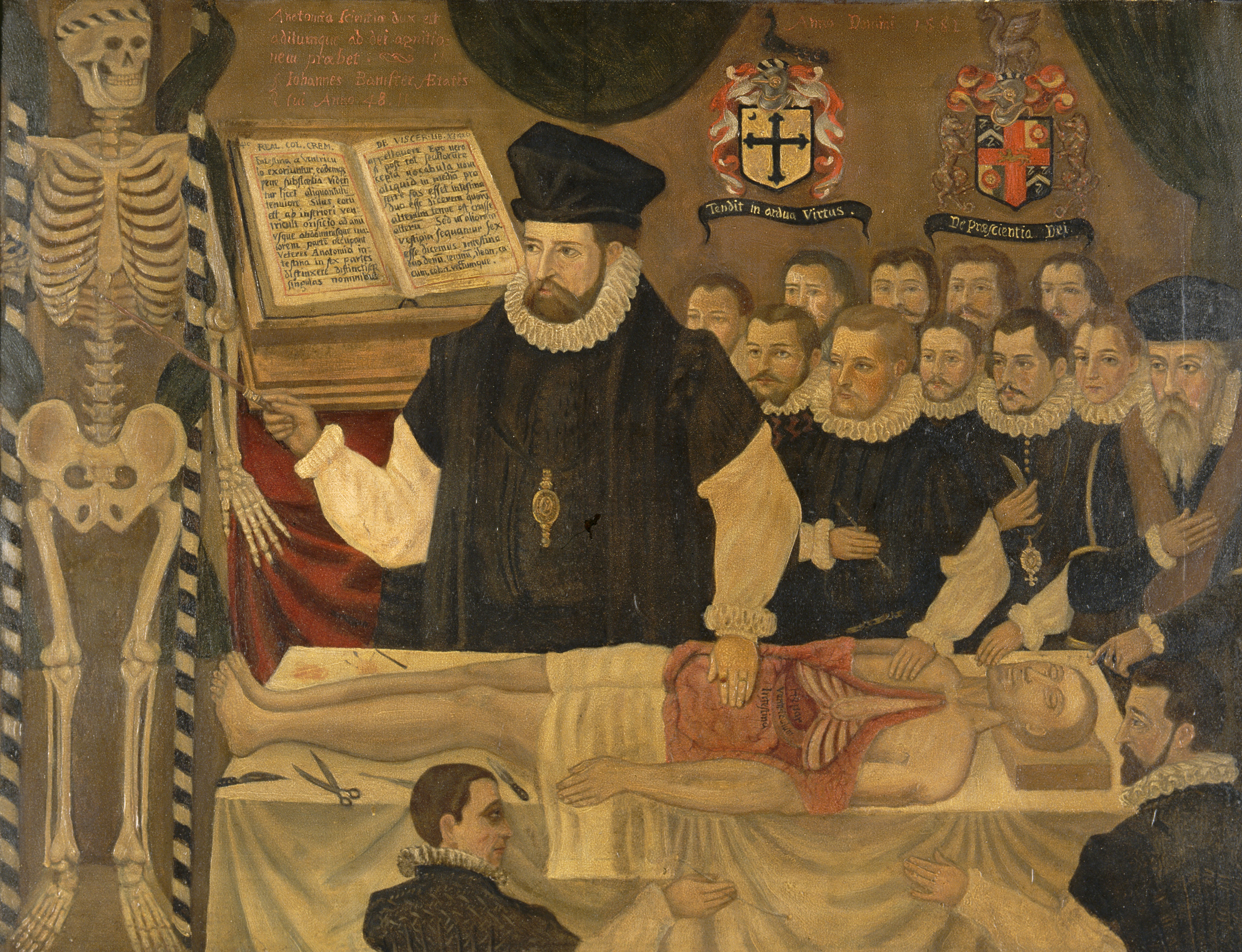
John Banister giving the "visceral lecture" to surgeons at the Barber-Surgeons' Hall.

John Banister (1533–1610) was an English anatomist, surgeon and teacher. He published The Historie of Man, from the most approved Authorities in this Present Age in 1578.

== Life ==
He attended Edward VI in his final illness. He continued his professional life as surgeon to the forces sent under Ambrose Dudley, 3rd Earl of Warwick in 1563 to relieve Le Havre. On this expedition he and William Clowes, another surgical author, began a friendship which lasted throughout their lives. Some time after his return he studied at Oxford, and received a license to practise in 1573. For several years he practised both physic and surgery at Nottingham.

The military expedition to the Low Countries under Robert Dudley, 1st Earl of Leicester in 1585 gave Banister another opportunity of public service, and he served on board a ship.

After the expedition he settled in London, living in Silver Street (which he mentions in his Antidotarie of 1589), not far from the Hall of the Barbers and Surgeons. In 1588 he and Clowes are associated in the dedication of John Read's Translation of Arceus. They saw many cases together, and in 1591 T. P., a patient of theirs, praised both surgeons in a bad English poem. Complaints were often made at that time to the College of Physicians as to surgeons practising medicine, and, perhaps in consequence of some such difficulty, Banister in 1593 obtained a royal letter of recommendation which led the college to grant him a license (15 February 1594) on the condition that in dangerous cases he should call in one of its fellows.

Banister was known for his kindness to the poor, especially to old soldiers, and for his extensive professional reading.

== Grave ==
He was buried in St Olave's Church, Silver Street. The church was destroyed in the Great Fire of London. He had a long epitaph in English verse.

== Works ==
He edited Johannes Jacob Wecker, with corrections, 'A Compendious Chyrurgerie gathered and translated (especially) out of Wecker,’ London, 1585. He compiled a collection of remedies and prescriptions, 'An Antidotarie Chyrurgicall,’ London, 1589, in which he acknowledges the generous help of his contemporaries, George Baker, Robert Balthrop, Clowes, and Goodrus. He also published in folio 'The History of Man, sucked from the Sap of the most approved Anatomists, 9 books, London, 1578.' Calametius, Tagaltius, and Wecker, three dry and unprofitable writers on surgery, form the basis of his writings. No cases from his own practice are given. In 1633, some time after Banister's death, a collected edition of his surgical works was published, 'The Workes of that Famous Chyrurgian, Mr. John Banester,’ in six books.

== See also ==
- History of anatomy in the 17th and 18th centuries
