= Yahya ibn Sarafyun =

9th-century Syrian Christian physician

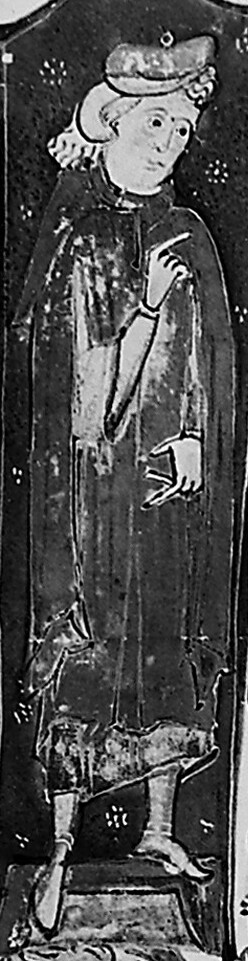
Yahya ibn Sarafyun expounding the laws of medicine.

Yahya ibn Sarafyun (9th century) a Syriac physician from Damascus, known in Europe as Johannes Serapion, and commonly called Serapion the Elder to distinguish him from Serapion the Younger, with whom he was often confused.

== Biography ==
Nothing is known of the events of his life, except that he was a Christian physician, and lived in the second half of the 9th century.

Two works are extant that bear his name; one called Aphorismi Magni Momenti de Medicina Practica; the other, entitled al-Kunnash, which has been published under the various names, Pandectae, Aggregator, Breviarium, Practica , and Therapeutica Methodus. The object of the work is to collect and put together in an abridged form the opinions of the Greek and Arabic physicians concerning diseases and their treatment. He also transcribes out of Alexander of Tralles, an author with whom few other Arabic writers seem to have been much acquainted.
