= Thomas Gale (surgeon) =

English surgeon (1507–1586)

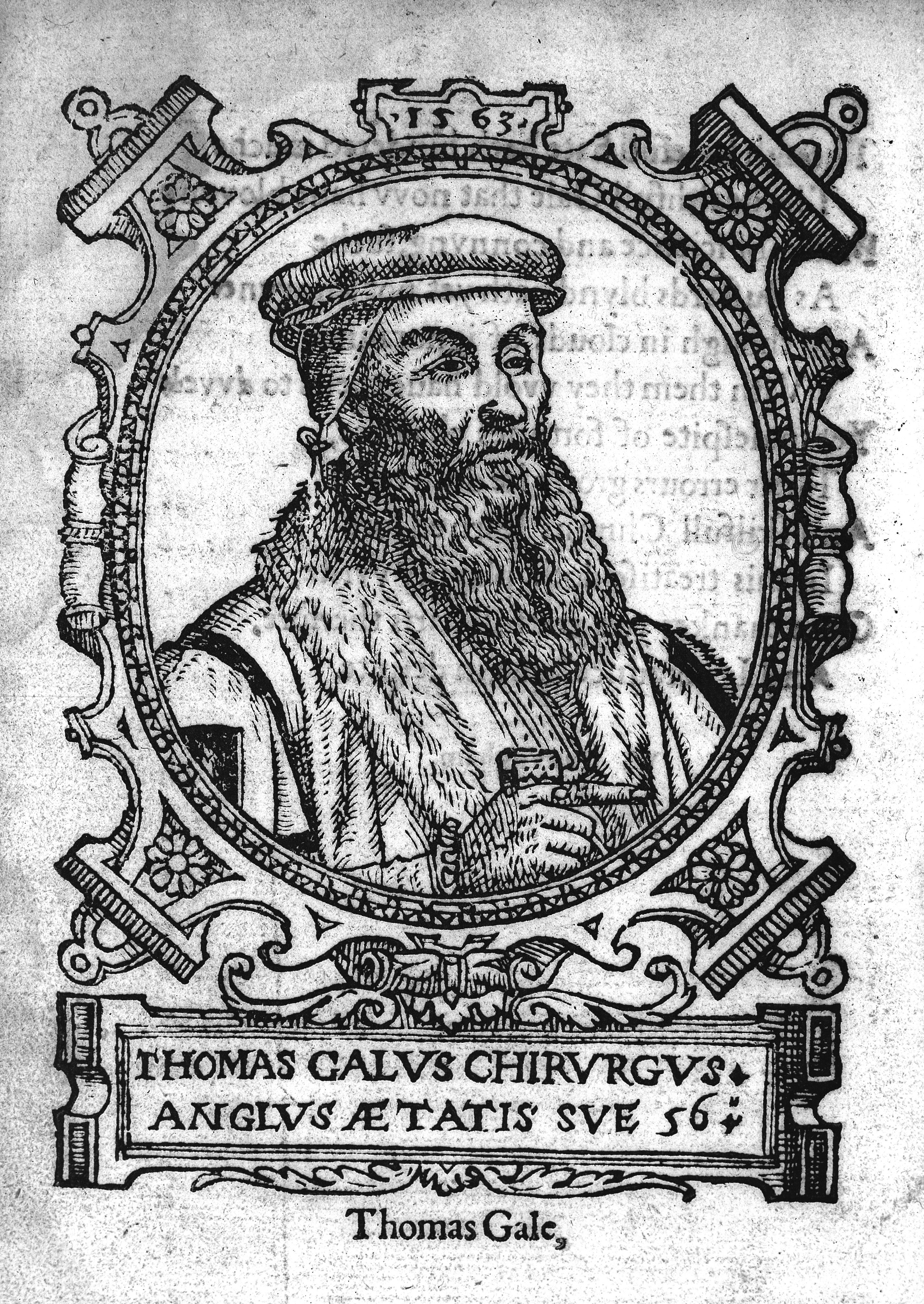
Portrait of Thomas Gale

Thomas Gale (1507–1586) was an English surgeon. Although earlier books on surgery had been published in English, these were translations of texts from the European continent: Gale's was the first book on surgery to be written in English.

Gale served with the army of Henry VIII of England in France.

== Publications ==
- "Certaine workes of chirurgie" 1563, printed in London by Rouland Hall.

== See also ==
- William Clowes (1540–1604)
