= William Clowes (surgeon) =

English surgeon (c. 1543/1544–1604)

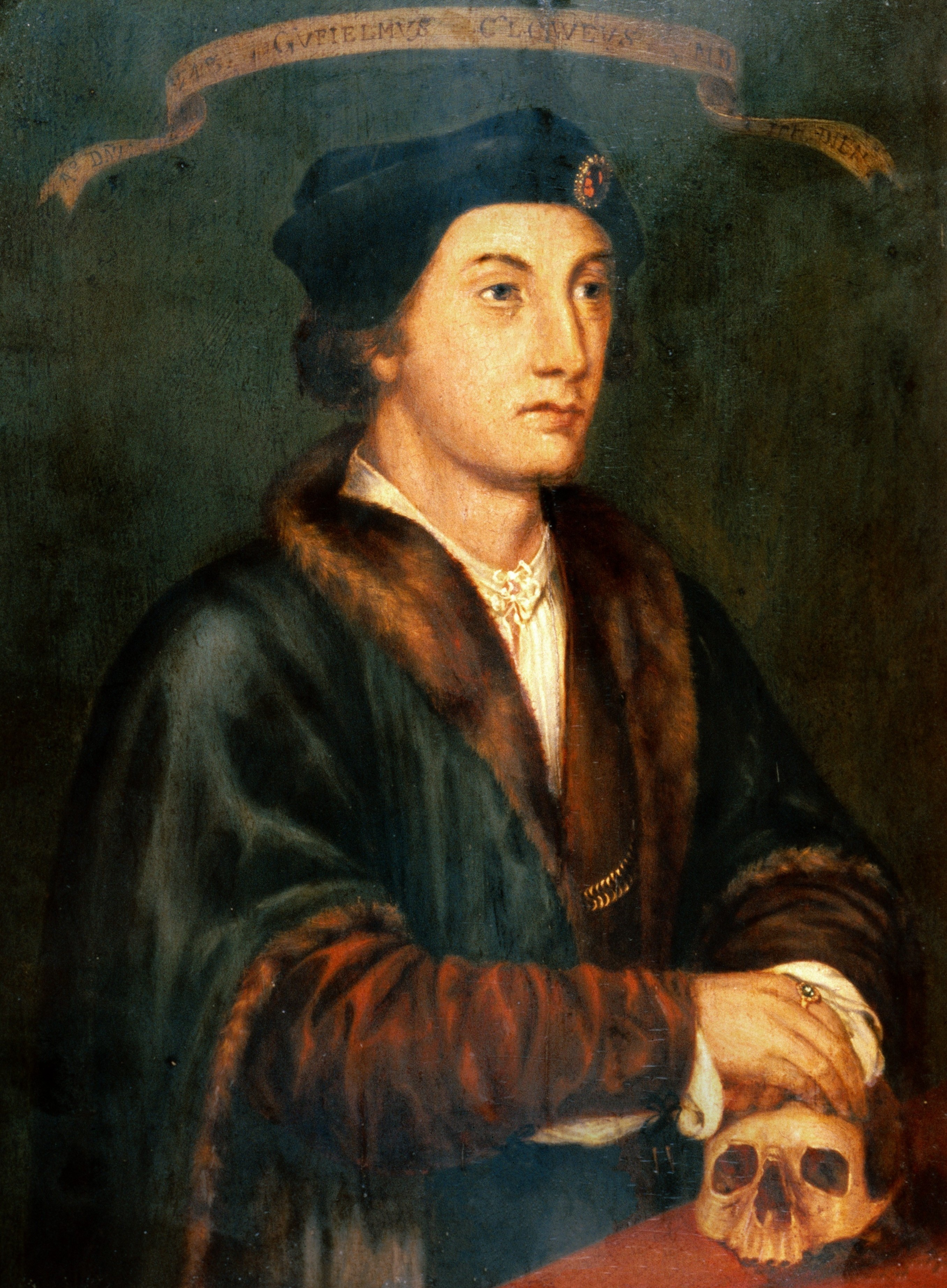
- Born: c. 1543/1544
- Died: 1604 (aged 59–60 or 60–61)
- Occupation: Surgeon
- Children: William Clowes the younger
- Parent: Emma Beauchamp Thomas Clowes

William Clowes the Elder (c. 1543/1544 – 1604) was an early English surgeon. He published case reports in which he advocated the application of powders and ointments. He also published one of the first reports in English on how to reduce a femur.

== Life ==
William Clowes was the son of Thomas and grandson of Nicholas Clowes, both of Kingsbury, Warwickshire. He learned surgery as apprentice of George Keble, a London surgeon, but not a member of the Barber-Surgeons' Company. Clowes began practice in 1563 as a surgeon in the army commanded by Ambrose Dudley, 3rd Earl of Warwick, in France, and on this expedition began his lifelong friendship with John Banester.

After the Le Havre expedition Clowes served for several years in the navy and then about 1569 settled in London. On 8 November in that year he was admitted by translation into the Barber-Surgeons' Company. He was successful in practice, with occasional disappointments, as when a man complained in 1573 that the cure of his wife was a failure and got twenty shillings damages from Clowes. In March 1575 he was appointed on the surgical staff of St. Bartholomew's Hospital, and became full surgeon in 1581. He also became surgeon to Christ's Hospital, and in his later works gives many details of his practice in both institutions. At St. Bartholomew's he introduced a new styptic powder which caused smaller sloughs than that of Thomas Gale, which it supplanted.

In May 1585, he resigned his surgeoncy at St. Bartholomew's, having been commanded to go to the Low Countries with Robert Dudley, 1st Earl of Leicester. In his Proved Practise Clowes gives many details of this expedition, and though bad surgeons, he says, slew more than the enemy, he and Mr. Goodrouse lost no cases from gunshot wounds but those mortally wounded at once. He attended Mr. Cripps, lieutenant of Sir Philip Sidney's horse, and was in the field when Sidney was wounded; but it is probable that if Sidney received any surgical help it was from the other chief surgeon whom Clowes often praises, Mr. Goodrouse or Godrus. Clowes had ideas on ambulance work, and remarks that scabbards make excellent splints. He learned what he could from every member of his craft, English or foreign, and by experiment; at Arnhem he tried with success a new balm on a pike-wound seven inches long.

After this war Clowes returned to London, and on 18 July 1588 was admitted an assistant on the court of the Barber-Surgeons' Company, and immediately after served in the fleet which defeated the Spanish Armada. He kept his military surgical chest by him, with the bear and ragged staff of his old commander on the lid, but was never called to serve in war again, and after being appointed surgeon to the queen, and spending several years in successful practice in London, retired to a country house at Plaistow in Essex. He died in 1604, before the beginning of August. He succeeded in handing on some court influence to his son William Clowes the younger, who was made surgeon to Henry Frederick, Prince of Wales a few years after his father's death.

== Works ==
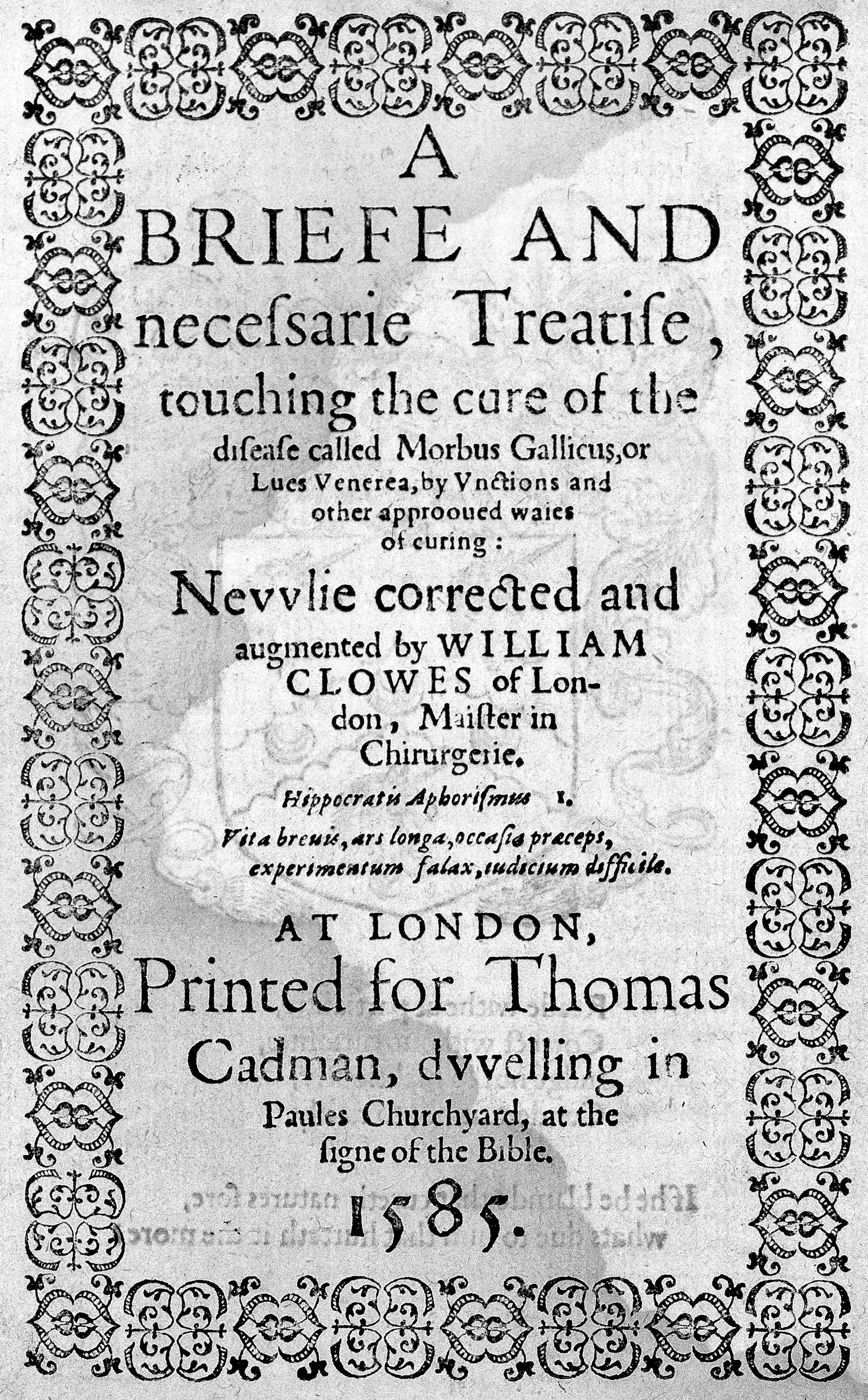
A briefe and necessary treatise by William Clowes.

The books of Clowes were the leading surgical writings of the Elizabethan age. They are all in English, sometimes a little prolix, but never obscure. He had read a great deal, and says that he had made Calmathius 'as it were a day-starre, or christallin cleare looking-glasse.' Tagalthius, Guido, Vigo, and Quercetanus are his other chief text-books, and he had read seventeen English authors on medicine. But he trusted to his own observation, and a spirit of inquiry pervades his pages which makes them altogether different from the compilations from authorities which are to be found in the surgical works of his contemporaries Baker and Banester. In 1579 he published his first book, De Morbo Gallico. It is mainly a compilation, and his best observations are to be found here and there in his later works.

His Prooved Practise for all young Chirurgians (London, 1591) and Treatise on the Struma (London, 1602) are full of pictures of daily life in the reign of Queen Elizabeth. He was called to a northern clothier whose leg was broken by robbers two miles outside London; to another man whose injury was received by the breaking down of a gallery at a bear-baiting; another patient was a serving-man whose leg had been pierced by an arrow as he walked near the butts; a fifth was one of Sir Francis Drake's sailors who had been shot by a poisoned arrow on the coast of Brazil; a sixth was a merchant wounded on his own ship by a pirate at the mouth of the Thames. Clowes cared little for critics, but he always speaks with generosity of his professional contemporaries Goodrouse, Banester, Bedon, and George Baker, the surgeons; John Gerard, Rodrigo López, Henry Wotton, Dr. Foster, and Dr. Randall, and Maister Rasis, the French king's surgeon. He had met all of them in consultation.

He did not conceal that he had secret remedies — 'my unguent,’ 'my balm,’ 'of my collection' — but he never made bargains for cures, and never touted for patients as some surgeons did at that time. He gives amusing accounts of his encounters with quacks, and prides himself on always acting as became 'a true artist.' He figures a barber's basin among his instruments of surgery, and says he was a good embalmer of dead bodies, and knew well from practice how to roll cerecloths

Besides ready colloquial English, he shows a wide acquaintance with proverbs, and a fair knowledge of French and of Latin. His books were all printed in London in black letter and quarto, and are:

- De Morbo Gallico, 1579. Treatise of the French or Spanish Pocks, by John Almenar, 1591, was a new edition.
- A Prooved Practise for all young Chirurgians concerning Burnings with Gunpowder, and Woundes made with Gunshot, Sword, Halbard, Pike, Launce, or such other,’ 1591. A Profitable and Necessary Book of Observations, 1596, was a new edition.
- A Right Frutefull and Approved Treatise for the Artificiall Cure of the Struma or Evill, cured by the Kinges and Queenes of England, 1602.

In 1637 reprints of his De Morbo Gallico and Profitable Book of Observations were published. Letters by him are printed in Banester's Antidotarie (1589), and in Peter Lowe's Surgery (1597).

== Notes ==
Attribution

This article incorporates text from a publication now in the public domain: Moore, Norman (1887). "Clowes, William (1540?-1604)". In Stephen, Leslie (ed.). Dictionary of National Biography. Vol. 11. London: Smith, Elder & Co. pp. 132–134.
