= Aaron of Alexandria =

Seventh-century Greek physician

Aaron of Alexandria (Greek: Άαρων ο Αλεξανδρεύς) was a Greek physician active in the 7th century. His works were translated into Arabic and Syriac, and were used later by al-Razi.

== Life and works ==
Aaron wrote 30 books on medicine, the "Pandects". He was the first medical author in antiquity who mentioned the diseases of small pox and measles.
