= History of surgery =

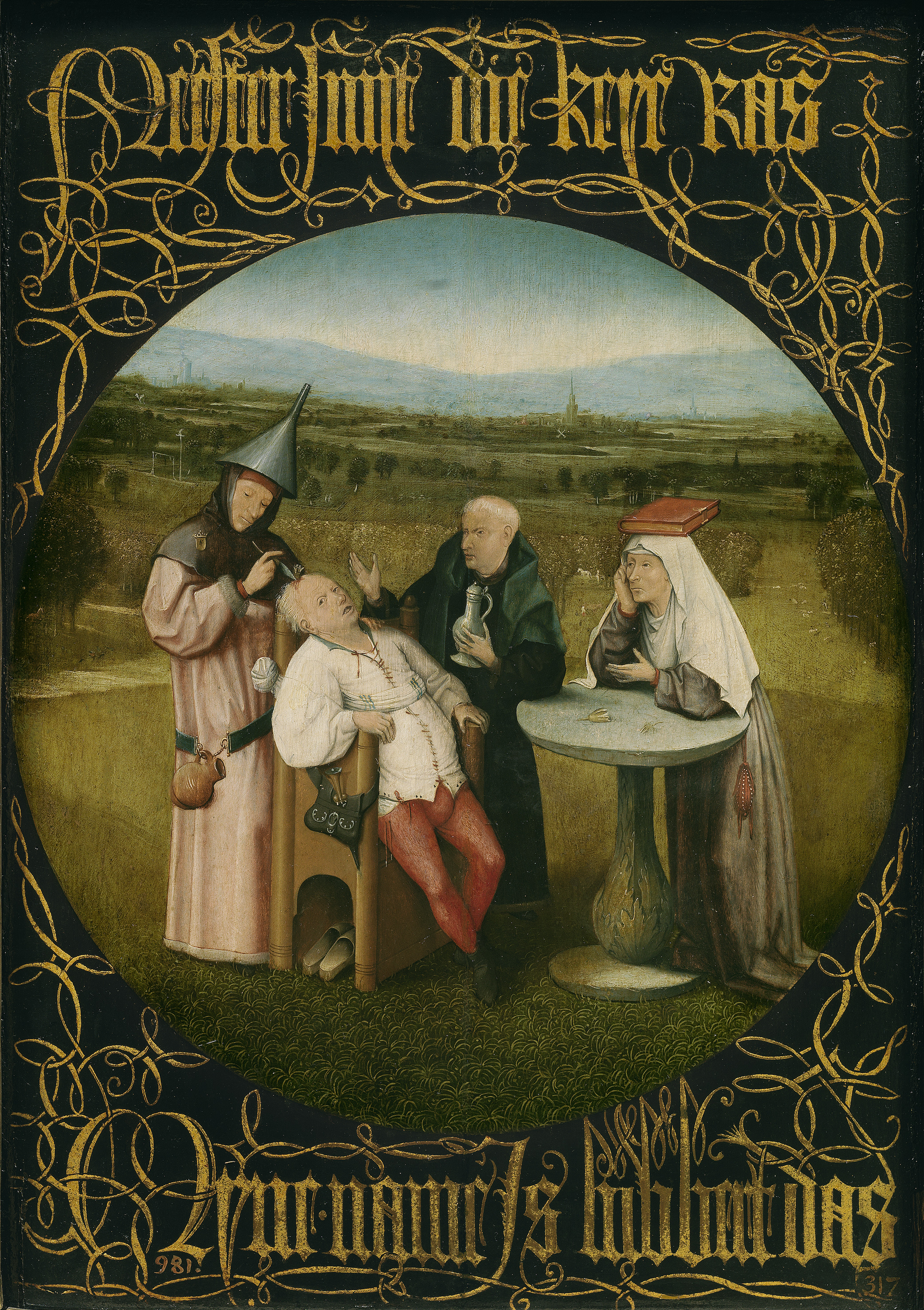
The Extraction of the Stone of Madness (The Cure of Folly) by Hieronymous Bosch

Surgery is the branch of medicine that deals with the physical manipulation of a bodily structure to diagnose, prevent, or cure an ailment. Ambroise Paré, a 16th-century French surgeon, stated that to perform surgery is, "To eliminate that which is superfluous, restore that which has been dislocated, separate that which has been united, join that which has been divided and repair the defects of nature."

Since humans first learned how to make and handle tools, they have employed these skills to develop increasingly sophisticated surgical techniques. However, until the Industrial Revolution, surgeons were incapable of overcoming the three principal obstacles which had plagued the medical profession from its infancy—bleeding, pain, and infection. Advances in these fields have transformed surgery from a risky art into a scientific discipline capable of treating many diseases and conditions.

== Origins ==
The first surgical techniques were developed to treat injuries and traumas. A combination of archaeological and anthropological studies offer insight into much earlier techniques for suturing lacerations, amputating unsalvageable limbs, and draining and cauterizing open wounds. Many examples exist: some Asian tribes used a mix of saltpeter and sulfur that was placed onto wounds and lit on fire to cauterize wounds; the Dakota people used the quill of a feather attached to an animal bladder to suck out purulent material; the discovery of needles from the Stone Age seems to suggest they were used in the suturing of cuts (the Maasai used needles of acacia for the same purpose); and tribes in India and South America developed an ingenious method of sealing minor injuries by applying termites or scarabs who bit the edges of the wound and then twisted the insects' neck, leaving their heads rigidly attached like staples.

=== Trepanation ===
The oldest operation for which evidence exists is trepanation (also known as trepanning, trephination, trephining or burr hole from Greek τρύπανον and τρυπανισμός), in which a hole is drilled or scraped into the skull for exposing the dura mater to treat health problems related to intracranial pressure and other diseases. In the case of head wounds, surgical intervention was implemented for investigating and diagnosing the nature of the wound and the extent of the impact while bone splinters were removed preferably by scraping followed by post operation procedures and treatments for avoiding infection and aiding in the healing process. Evidence has been found in prehistoric human remains from Proto-Neolithic and Neolithic times, in cave paintings, and the procedure continued in use well into recorded history (being described by ancient Greek writers such as Hippocrates). Out of 120 prehistoric skulls found at one burial site in France dated to 6500 BCE, 40 had trepanation holes. Folke Henschen, a Swedish doctor and historian, asserts that Soviet excavations of the banks of the Dnieper River in the 1970s show the existence of trepanation in Mesolithic times dated to approximately 12000 BCE. The remains suggest a belief that trepanning could cure epileptic seizures, migraines, and certain mental disorders.

There is significant evidence of healing of the bones of the skull in prehistoric skeletons, suggesting that many of those that proceeded with the surgery survived their operation. In some studies, the rate of survival surpassed 50%.

=== Amputation ===
The oldest known surgical amputation was carried out in Borneo about 31,000 years ago. The operation involved the removal of the distal third of the left lower leg. The person survived the operation and lived for another 6 to 9 years. This is the only known surgical amputation carried out before the Neolithic Revolution and its farming transition. The next oldest known amputation was carried out about 7000 years ago on a farmer in France whose left forearm had been surgically removed.

=== Setting bones ===
Examples of healed fractures in prehistoric human bones, suggesting setting and splinting have been found in the archeological record. Among some treatments used by the Aztecs, according to Spanish texts during the conquest of Mexico, was the reduction of fractured bones: "...the broken bone had to be splinted, extended and adjusted, and if this was not sufficient an incision was made at the end of the bone, and a branch of fir was inserted into the cavity of the medulla..." Modern medicine developed a technique similar to this in the 20th century known as medullary fixation.

=== Bloodletting ===
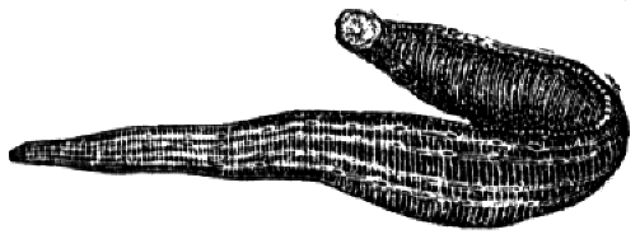
Hirudo medicinalis. Leeches for bloodletting

Bloodletting is one of the oldest medical practices, having been practiced among diverse ancient peoples, including the Mesopotamians, the Egyptians, the Greeks, the Mayans, Indians and the Aztecs. In Greece, bloodletting was in use around the time of Hippocrates, who mentions bloodletting but in general relied on dietary techniques. Erasistratus, however, theorized that many diseases were caused by plethoras, or overabundances, in the blood, and advised that these plethoras be treated, initially, by exercise, sweating, reduced food intake, and vomiting. Herophilus advocated bloodletting. Archagathus, one of the first Greek physicians to practice in Rome, practiced bloodletting extensively. The art of bloodletting became very popular in the West, and during the Renaissance one could find bloodletting calendars that recommended appropriate times to bloodlet during the year and books that claimed bloodletting would cure inflammation, infections, strokes, manic psychosis and more.

== Antiquity ==
=== Mesopotamia ===
The Sumerians saw sickness as a divine punishment imposed by different demons when an individual broke a rule. For this reason, to be a physician, one had to learn to identify approximately 6,000 possible demons that might cause health problems. To do this, the Sumerians employed divining techniques based on the flight of birds, position of the stars and the livers of certain animals. In this way, medicine was intimately linked to priests, relegating surgery to a second-class medical specialty.

Nevertheless, the Sumerians developed several important medical techniques: in Ninevah archaeologists have discovered bronze instruments with sharpened obsidian resembling modern day scalpels, knives, trephines, etc. The Code of Hammurabi, one of the earliest Babylonian code of laws, itself contains specific legislation regulating surgeons and medical compensation as well as malpractice and victim's compensation:

215. If a physician make a large incision with an operating knife and cure it, or if he open a tumor (over the eye) with an operating knife, and saves the eye, he shall receive ten shekels in money.

217. If he be the slave of some one, his owner shall give the physician two shekels.

218. If a physician make a large incision with the operating knife, and kill him, or open a tumor with the operating knife, and cut out the eye, his hands shall be cut off.

220. If he had opened a tumor with the operating knife, and put out his eye, he shall pay half his value.

=== Egypt ===
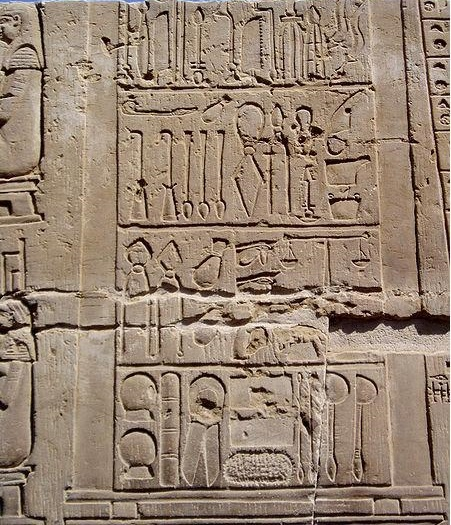
Pictures of surgery tools at Kom Ombo, Egypt

Around 3100 BCE Egyptian civilization began to flourish when Narmer, the first Pharaoh of Egypt, established the capital of Memphis. Just as cuneiform tablets preserved the knowledge of the ancient Sumerians, hieroglyphics preserved the Egyptians'.

In the first monarchic age (2700 BCE) the first treatise on surgery was written by Imhotep, the vizier of Pharaoh Djoser, priest, astronomer, physician and first notable architect. So much was he famed for his medical skill that he became the Egyptian god of medicine. Other famous physicians from the Ancient Empire (from 2500 to 2100 BCE) were Sachmet, the physician of Pharaoh Sahure and Nesmenau, whose office resembled that of a medical director.

On one of the doorjambs of the entrance to the Temple of Memphis there is the oldest recorded engraving of a medical procedure: circumcision and engravings in Kom Ombo, Egypt depict surgical tools. Still of all the discoveries made in ancient Egypt, the most important discovery relating to ancient Egyptian knowledge of medicine is the Ebers Papyrus, named after its discoverer Georg Ebers. The Ebers Papyrus, conserved at the University of Leipzig, is considered one of the oldest treaties on medicine and the most important medical papyri. The text is dated to about 1550 BCE and measures 20 meters in length. The text includes recipes, a pharmacopoeia and descriptions of numerous diseases as well as cosmetic treatments. It mentions how to surgically treat crocodile bites and serious burns, recommending the drainage of pus-filled inflammation but warns against certain diseased skin.

==== Edwin Smith Papyrus ====
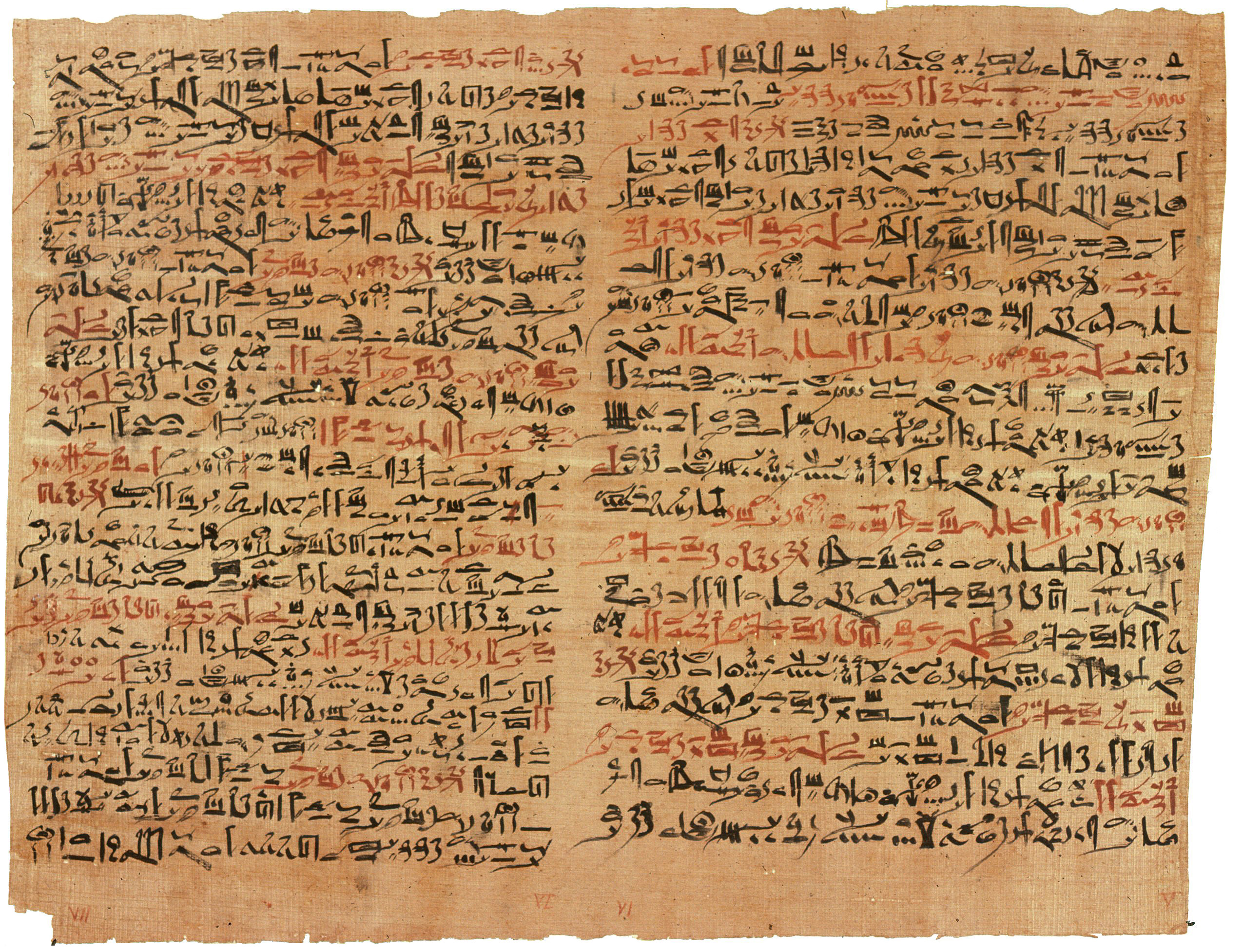
Plates vi and vii of the Edwin Smith Papyrus (around the 17th century BC), among the earliest medical texts

The Edwin Smith Papyrus is a lesser known papyrus dating from the 1600 BCE and only 5 meters in length. It is a manual for performing traumatic surgery and gives 48 case histories. The Smith Papyrus describes a treatment for repairing a broken nose, and the use of sutures to close wounds. Infections were treated with honey. For example, it gives instructions for dealing with a dislocated vertebra:

Thou shouldst bind it with fresh meat the first day. Thou shouldst loose his bandages and apply grease to his head as far as his neck, (and) thou shouldst bind it with ymrw. Thou shouldst treat it afterwards with honey every day, (and) his relief is sitting until he recovers.

=== South Asia ===
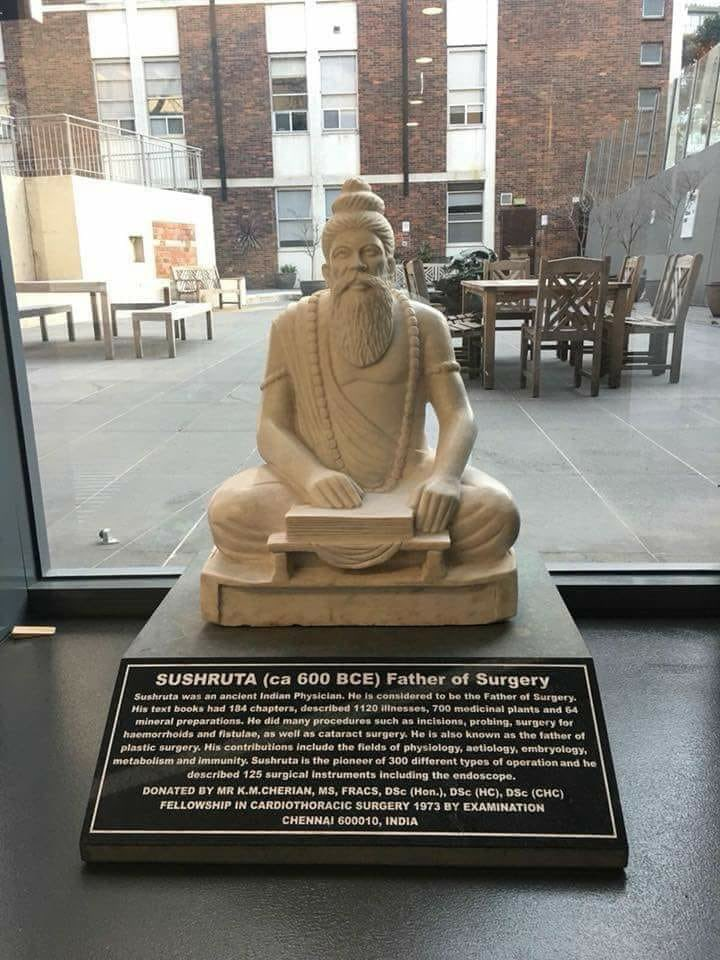
A statue of Sushruta (800 BCE), author of Sushruta Samhita and the founding father of surgery, at Royal Australasian College of Surgeons in Melbourne, Australia

==== Mehrgarh ====
Teeth discovered from a Neolithic graveyard in Mehrgarh had shown signs of drilling. Analysis of the teeth shows prehistoric people might have attempted curing toothache with drills made from flintheads.

==== Ayurveda ====
Sushruta (c. 600 BCE) is considered as the "founding father of surgery". His period is usually placed between the period of 1200 BC – 600 BC. One of the earliest known mention of the name is from the Bower Manuscript where Sushruta is listed as one of the ten sages residing in the Himalayas. Texts also suggest that he learned surgery at Kasi from Lord Dhanvantari, the god of medicine in Hindu mythology. He was an early innovator of plastic surgery who taught and practiced surgery on the banks of the Ganges in the area that corresponds to the present day city of Varanasi in Northern India. Much of what is known about Sushruta is in Sanskrit contained in a series of volumes he authored, which are collectively known as the Sushruta Samhita. It is one of the oldest known surgical texts and it describes in detail the examination, diagnosis, treatment, and prognosis of numerous ailments, as well as procedures on performing various forms of cosmetic surgery, plastic surgery and rhinoplasty.

=== Greece and the Hellenized world ===
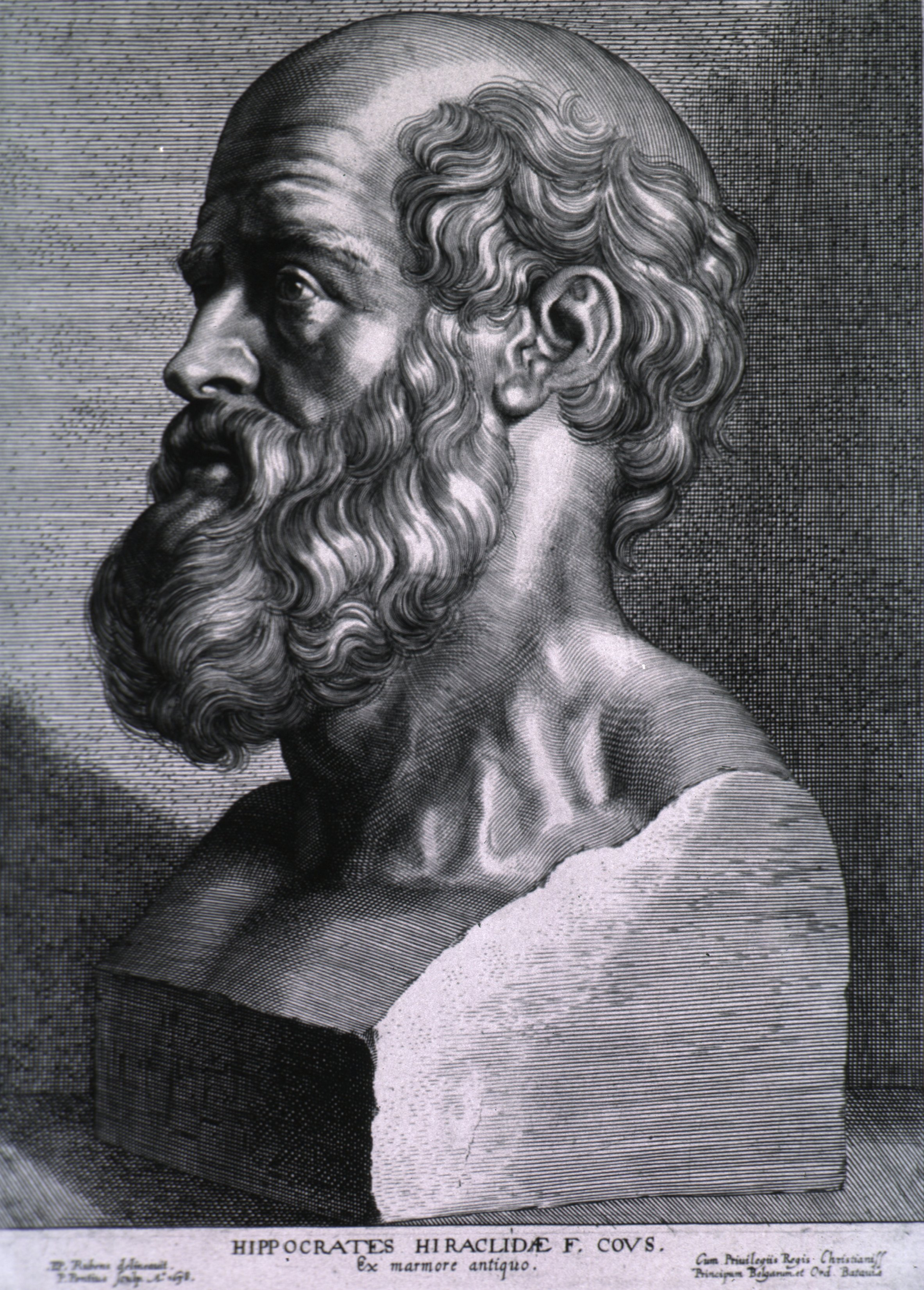
Engraving of Hippocrates by Peter Paul Rubens, 1638

Surgeons are now considered to be specialized physicians, whereas in the early ancient Greek world a trained general physician had to use his hands (χείρ in Greek) to carry out all medical and medicinal processes including, for example, the treating of wounds sustained on the battlefield, or the treatment of broken bones (a process called in Greek: χειρουργείν).

In The Iliad Homer names two doctors, “the two sons of Asklepios, the admirable physicians Podaleirius and Machaon and one acting doctor, Patroclus. Because Machaon is wounded and Podaleirius is in combat Eurypylus asks Patroclus “to cut out this arrow from my thigh, wash off the blood with warm water and spread soothing ointment on the wound."

==== Hippocrates ====
The Hippocratic Oath, written in the 5th century BC provides the earliest protocol for professional conduct and ethical behavior a young physician needed to abide by in life and in treating and managing the health and privacy of his patients. The multiple volumes of the Hippocratic corpus and the Hippocratic Oath elevated and separated the standards of proper Hippocratic medical conduct and its fundamental medical and surgical principles from other practitioners of folk medicine often laden with superstitious constructs, and/or of specialists of sorts some of whom would endeavor to carry out invasive body procedures with dubious consequences, such as lithotomy. Works from the Hippocratic corpus include; On the Articulations or On Joints, On Fractures, On the Instruments of Reduction, The Physician's Establishment or Surgery, On Injuries of the Head, On Ulcers, On Fistulae, and On Hemorrhoids.

==== Celsus and Alexandria ====
Herophilus of Chalcedon and Erasistratus of Ceos were two great Alexandrians who laid the foundations for the scientific study of anatomy and physiology. Alexandrian surgeons were responsible for developments in ligature (hemostasis), lithotomy, hernia operations, ophthalmic surgery, plastic surgery, methods of reduction of dislocations and fractures, tracheotomy, and mandrake as anesthesia. Most of what we know of them comes from Celsus and Galen of Pergamum (Greek: Γαληνός)

==== Galen ====
Galen's On the Natural Faculties, Books I, II, and III, is an paradigm of an accomplished Greek surgeon and physician of the 2nd century Roman era, who carried out complex surgical operations and added significantly to the corpus of animal and human physiology and the art of surgery. He was one of the first to use ligatures in his experiments on animals. Galen is also known as "The king of the catgut suture"

=== China ===
In China, instruments resembling surgical tools have also been found in the archaeological sites of Bronze Age dating from the Shang dynasty, along with seeds likely used for herbalism.

==== Hua Tuo ====
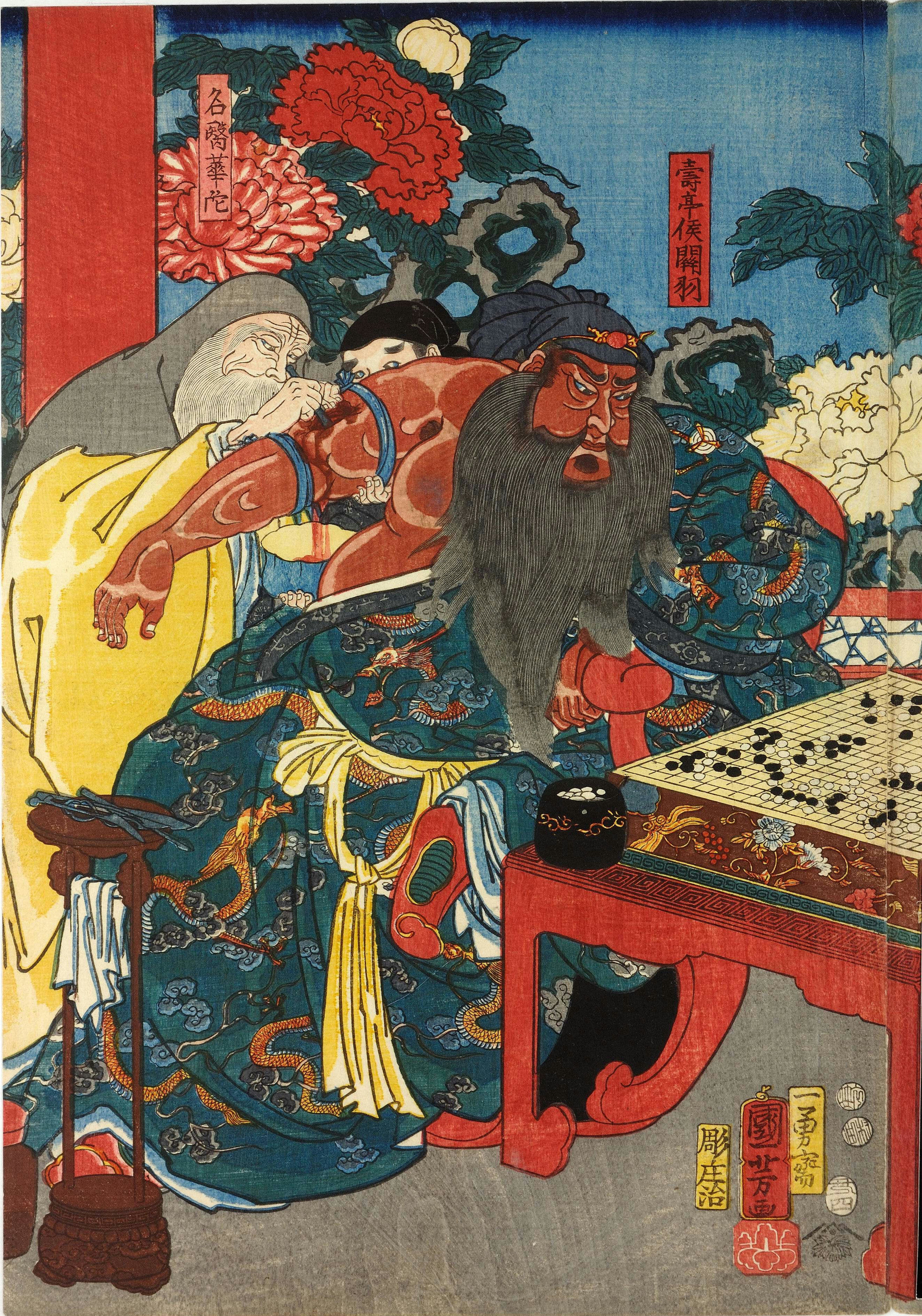
Woodblock printing by Utagawa Kuniyoshi of Hua Tuo

Hua Tuo (140–208) was a famous Chinese physician during the Eastern Han and Three Kingdoms era. He was the first person to perform surgery with the aid of anesthesia, some 1600 years before the practice was adopted by Europeans. Bian Que (Pien Ch'iao) was a "miracle doctor" described by the Chinese historian Sima Qian in his Shiji who was credited with many skills. Another book, Liezi (Lieh Tzu) describes that Bian Que conducted a two way exchange of hearts between people. This account also credited Bian Que with using general anaesthesia which would place it far before Hua Tuo, but the source in Liezi is questioned and the author may have been compiling stories from other works. Nonetheless, it establishes the concept of heart transplantation back to around 300 BCE.

== Middle Ages ==
Paul of Aegina's (c. 625 – c. 690 AD) Pragmateia or Compendiem was highly influential. Abulcasis Al-Zahrawi of the Islamic Golden Age later repeated the material, adding a number of his own discoveries.

Hunayn ibn Ishaq (809–873) was an Arab Nestorian Christian physician who translated many Greek medical and scientific texts, including those of Galen, writing the second systematic treatment of ophthalmology. Egypt-born Jewish physician Isaac Israeli ben Solomon (832–892) also left many medical works written in Arabic that were translated and adopted by European universities in the early 13th century.

The Persian physician Muhammad ibn Zakariya al-Razi (c. 865–925) advanced experimental medicine, pioneering ophthalmology and founding pediatrics. The Persian physician Ali ibn Abbas al-Majusi (d. 994) worked at the Al-Adudi Hospital in Baghdad, leaving The Complete Book of the Medical Art, which stressed the need for medical ethics and discussed the anatomy and physiology of the human brain. Persian physician Avicenna (980–1037) wrote The Canon of Medicine, a synthesis of Greek and Arab medicine that dominated European medicine until the mid-17th century.

In the 9th century the Medical School of Salerno in southwest Italy was founded, making use of Arabic texts and flourishing through the 13th century.

Abulcasis (936–1013) (Abu al-Qasim Khalaf ibn al-Abbas Al-Zahrawi) was an Andalusian-Arab physician and scientist who practised in the Zahra suburb of Cordoba. He is considered to be the greatest medieval surgeon; he synthesized prior Greek works on surgery with medical practices and pharmacological knowledge from the Arab world, and described (and sometimes invented) a number of surgical tools. He is credited with a number of important advances in surgery, such as his discovery that catgut could be used for internal sutures as it would be absorbed by the body. His works on surgery were highly influential.

African-born Italian Benedictine monk (Muslim convert) Constantine the African (died 1099) of Monte Cassino translated many Arabic medical works into Latin.

Spanish Muslim physician Avenzoar (1094–1162) performed the first tracheotomy on a goat, writing Book of Simplification on Therapeutics and Diet, which became popular in Europe. Spanish Muslim physician Averroes (1126–1198) was the first to explain the function of the retina and to recognize acquired immunity with smallpox.

Universities such as Montpellier, Padua and Bologna were particularly renowned.

In the late 12th century Rogerius Salernitanus composed his Chirurgia, laying the foundation for modern Western surgical manuals. Roland of Parma and Surgery of the Four Masters were responsible for spreading Roger's work to Italy, France, and England. Roger seems to have been influenced more by the 6th-century Aëtius and Alexander of Tralles, and the 7th-century Paul of Aegina, than by the Arabs. Hugh of Lucca (1150−1257) founded the Bologna School and rejected the theory of "laudable pus".

In the 13th century in Europe skilled town craftsmen called barber-surgeons performed amputations and set broken bones while suffering lower status than university educated doctors. By 1308 the Worshipful Company of Barbers in London was flourishing. With little or no formal training, they generally had a bad reputation that was not to improve until the development of academic surgery as a specialty of medicine rather than an accessory field in the 18th-century Age of Enlightenment.

Guy de Chauliac (1298–1368) was one of the most eminent surgeons of the Middle Ages. His Chirurgia Magna or Great Surgery (1363) was a standard text for surgeons until well into the seventeenth century."

== Early modern Europe ==
There were some important advances to the art of surgery during this period. Andreas Vesalius (1514–1564), professor of anatomy at the University of Padua was a pivotal figure in the Renaissance transition from classical medicine and anatomy based on the works of Galen, to an empirical approach of 'hands-on' dissection. His anatomic treatise De humani corporis fabrica exposed many anatomical errors in Galen and advocated that all surgeons should train by engaging in practical dissections themselves.

The second figure of importance in this era was Ambroise Paré (sometimes spelled "Ambrose" (c. 1510 – 1590)), a French army surgeon from the 1530s until his death in 1590. The practice for cauterizing gunshot wounds on the battlefield had been to use boiling oil, an extremely dangerous and painful procedure. Paré began to employ a less irritating emollient, made of egg yolk, rose oil and turpentine. He also described more efficient techniques for the effective ligation of the blood vessels during an amputation. In the same century, Eleno de Céspedes became perhaps the first female, transgender, or intersex surgeon in Spain, and perhaps in Europe.

Another important early figure was German surgeon Wilhelm Fabry (1540–1634), "the Father of German Surgery", who was the first to recommend amputation above the gangrenous area, and to describe a windlass (twisting stick) tourniquet. His Swiss wife and assistant Marie Colinet (1560–1640) improved the techniques for Caesarean Section, introducing the use of heat for dilating and stimulating the uterus during labor. In 1624 she became the first to use a magnet to remove metal from a patient's eye, although he received the credit.

Surgical pioneers in Early modern Europe

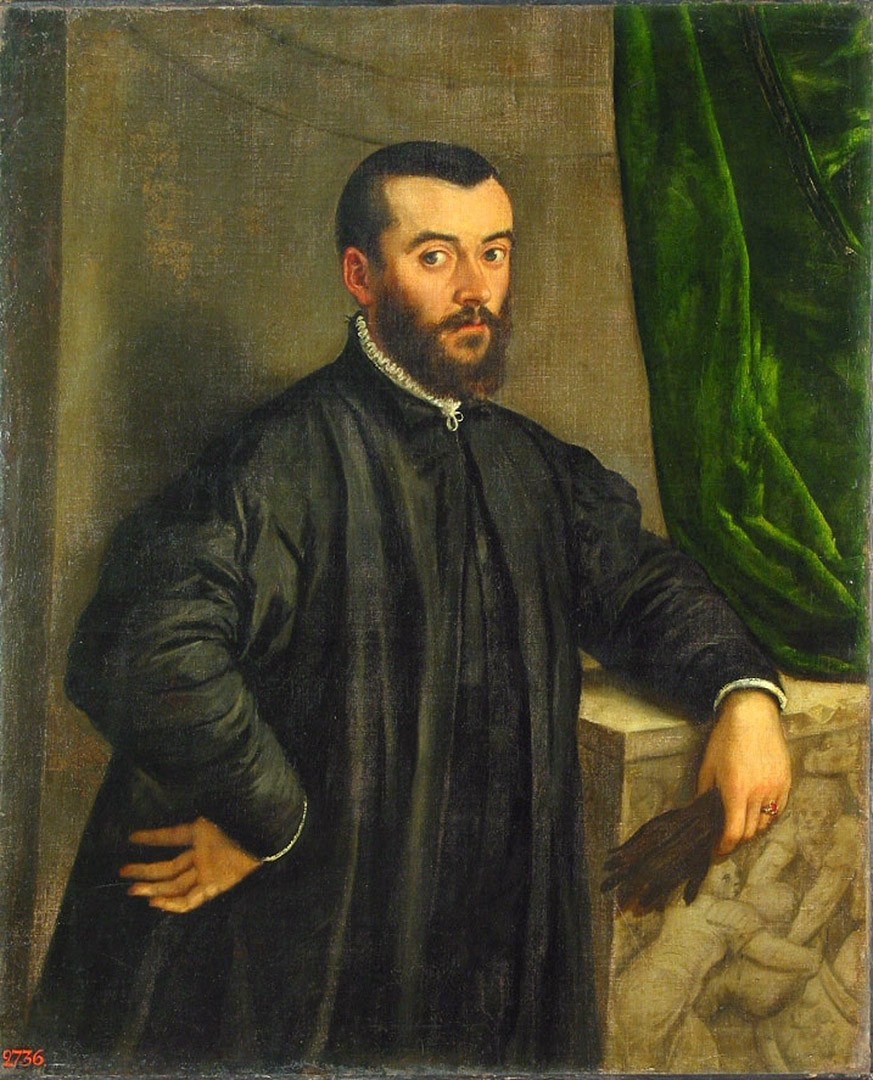
Andreas Vesalius (1514–1564)

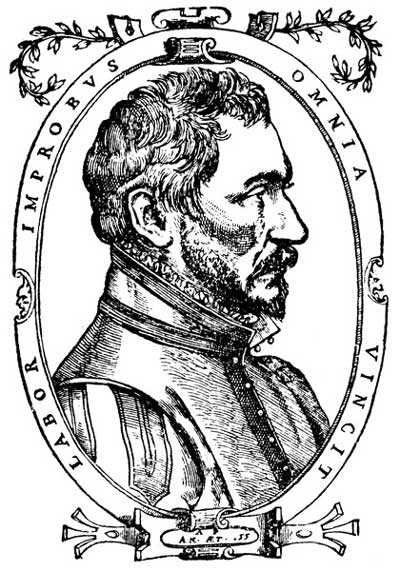
Ambroise Paré (c. 1510–1590), father of modern military surgery

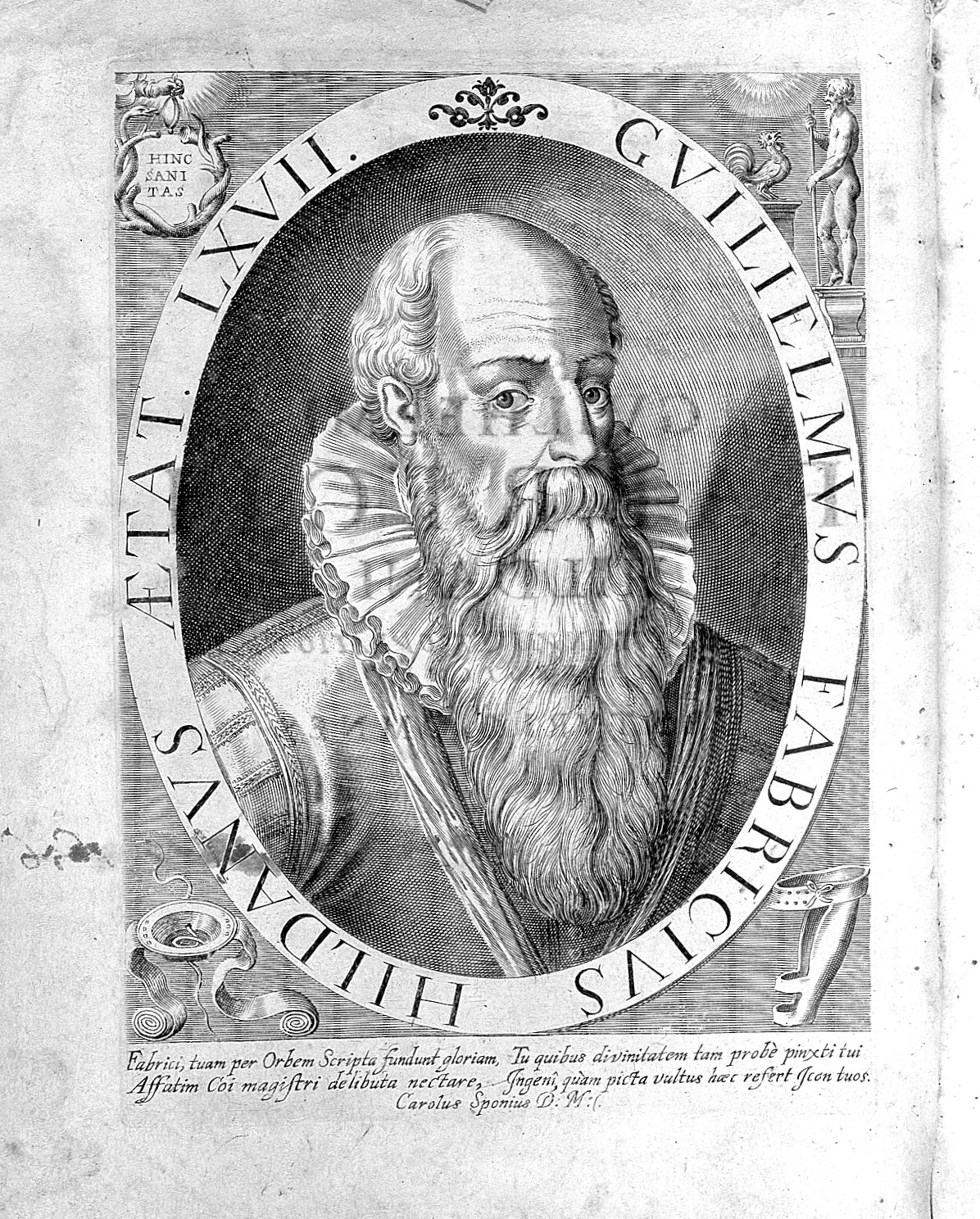
Wilhelm Fabry (1540–1634), father of German surgery

== Modern surgery ==
=== Scientific surgery ===
The discipline of surgery was put on a sound, scientific footing during the Age of Enlightenment in Europe (1715–90). An important figure in this regard was the Scottish surgical scientist (in London) John Hunter (1728–1793), generally regarded as the father of modern scientific surgery. He brought an empirical and experimental approach to the science and was renowned around Europe for the quality of his research and his written works. Hunter reconstructed surgical knowledge from scratch; refusing to rely on the testimonies of others he conducted his own surgical experiments to determine the truth of the matter. To aid comparative analysis, he built up a collection of over 13,000 specimens of separate organ systems, from the simplest plants and animals to humans.

Hunter greatly advanced knowledge of venereal disease and introduced many new techniques of surgery, including new methods for repairing damage to the Achilles tendon and a more effective method for applying ligature of the arteries in case of an aneurysm. He was also one of the first to understand the importance of pathology, the danger of the spread of infection and how the problem of inflammation of the wound, bone lesions and even tuberculosis often undid any benefit that was gained from the intervention. He consequently adopted the position that all surgical procedures should be used only as a last resort.

Hunter's student Benjamin Bell (1749–1806) became the first scientific surgeon in Scotland, advocating the routine use of opium in post-operative recovery, and counseling surgeons to "save skin" to speed healing; his great-grandson Joseph Bell (1837–1911) became the inspiration for Arthur Conan Doyle's literary hero Sherlock Holmes.

Other important 18th- and early 19th-century surgeons included Percival Pott (1714–1788), who first described tuberculosis of the spine and first demonstrated that a cancer may be caused by an environmental carcinogen after he noticed a connection between chimney sweep's exposure to soot and their high incidence of scrotal cancer. Astley Paston Cooper (1768–1841) first performed a successful ligation of the abdominal aorta. James Syme (1799–1870) pioneered the Symes Amputation for the ankle joint and successfully carried out the first hip disarticulation. Dutch surgeon Antonius Mathijsen invented the Plaster of Paris cast in 1851.

Pioneers of Scientific Surgery

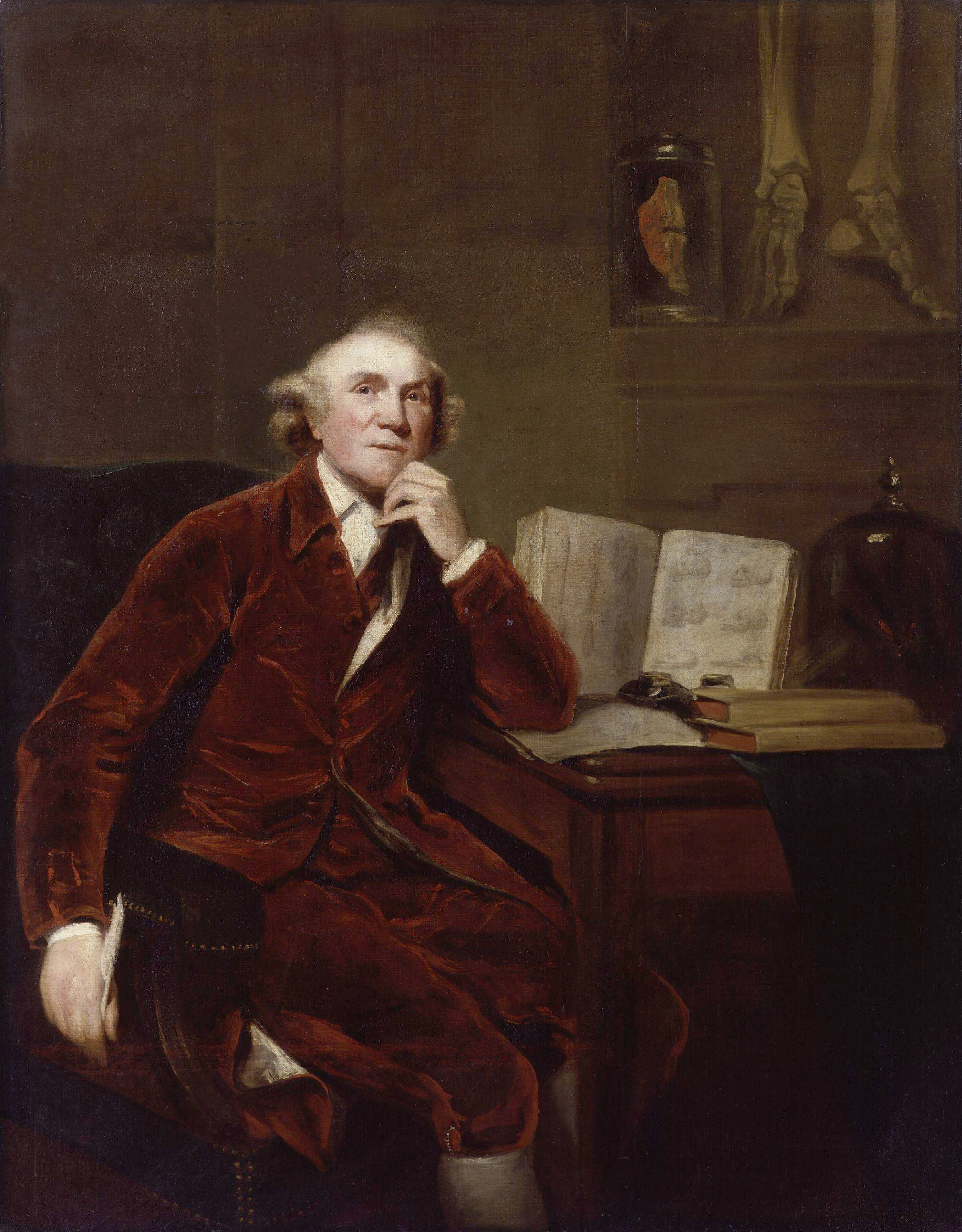
John Hunter (1728–1793), father of modern scientific surgery

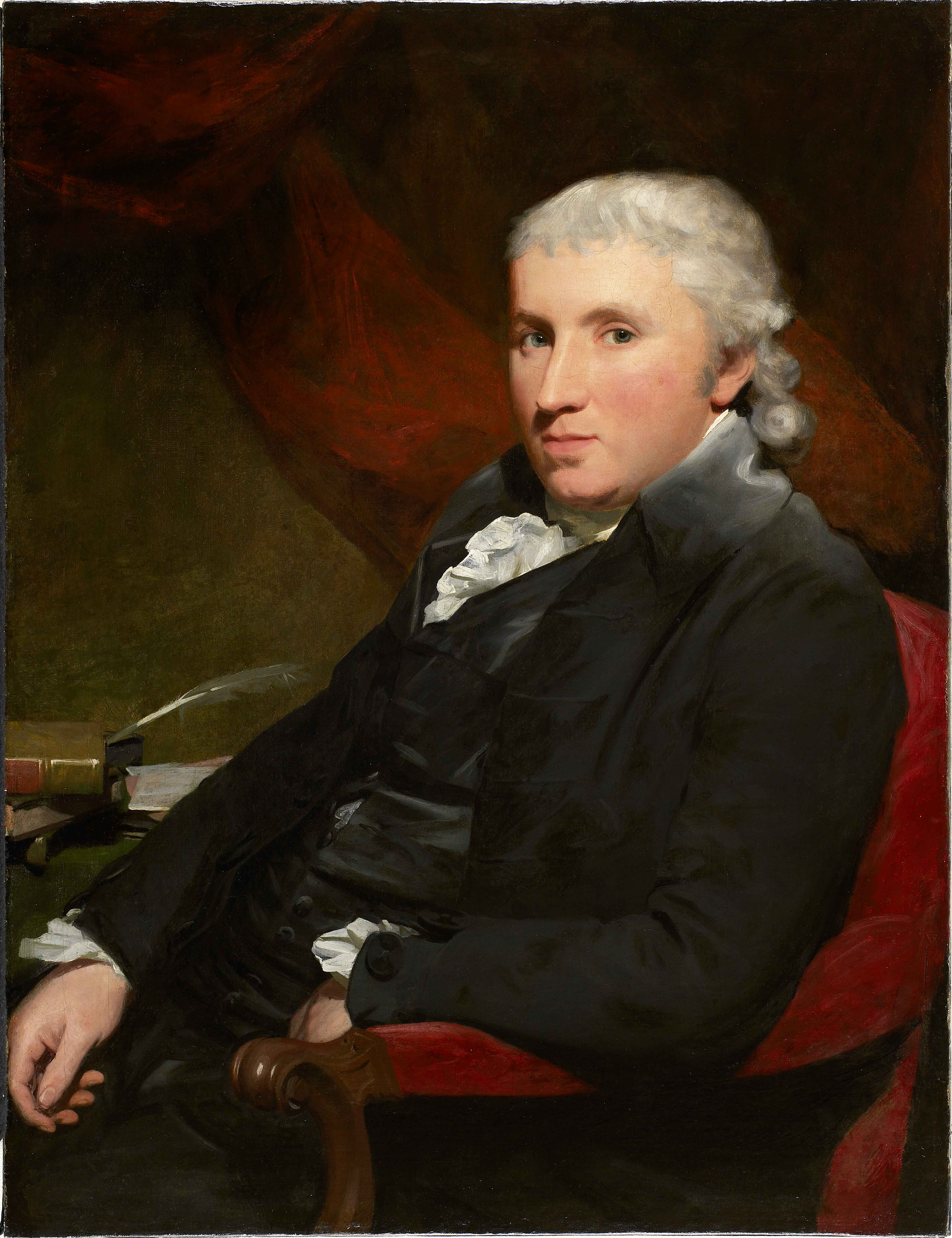
Benjamin Bell (1749–1806) by Sir Henry Raeburn. c1780

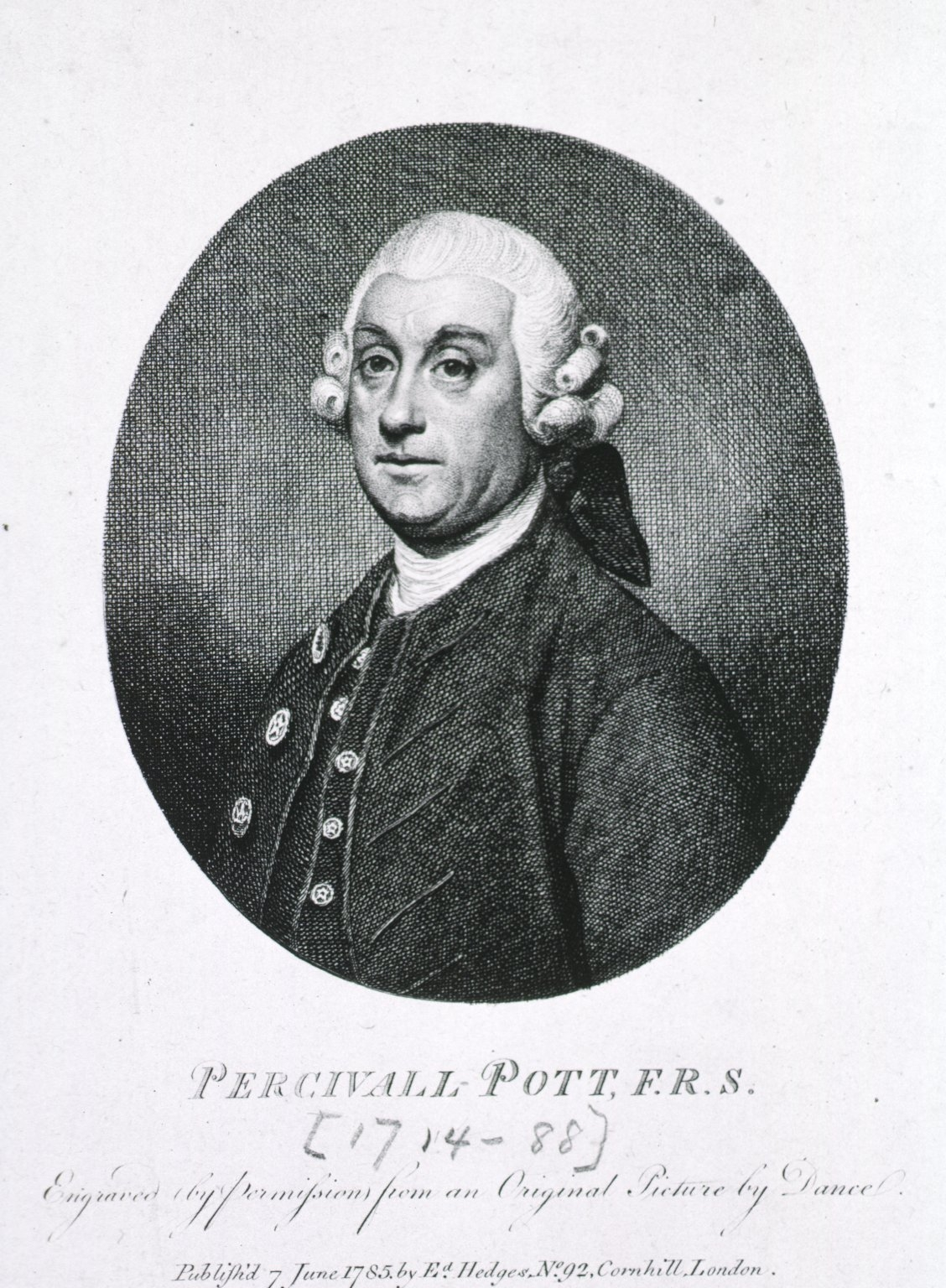
Percivall Pott (1714–1788), engraved from an original picture by Nathaniel Dance-Holland

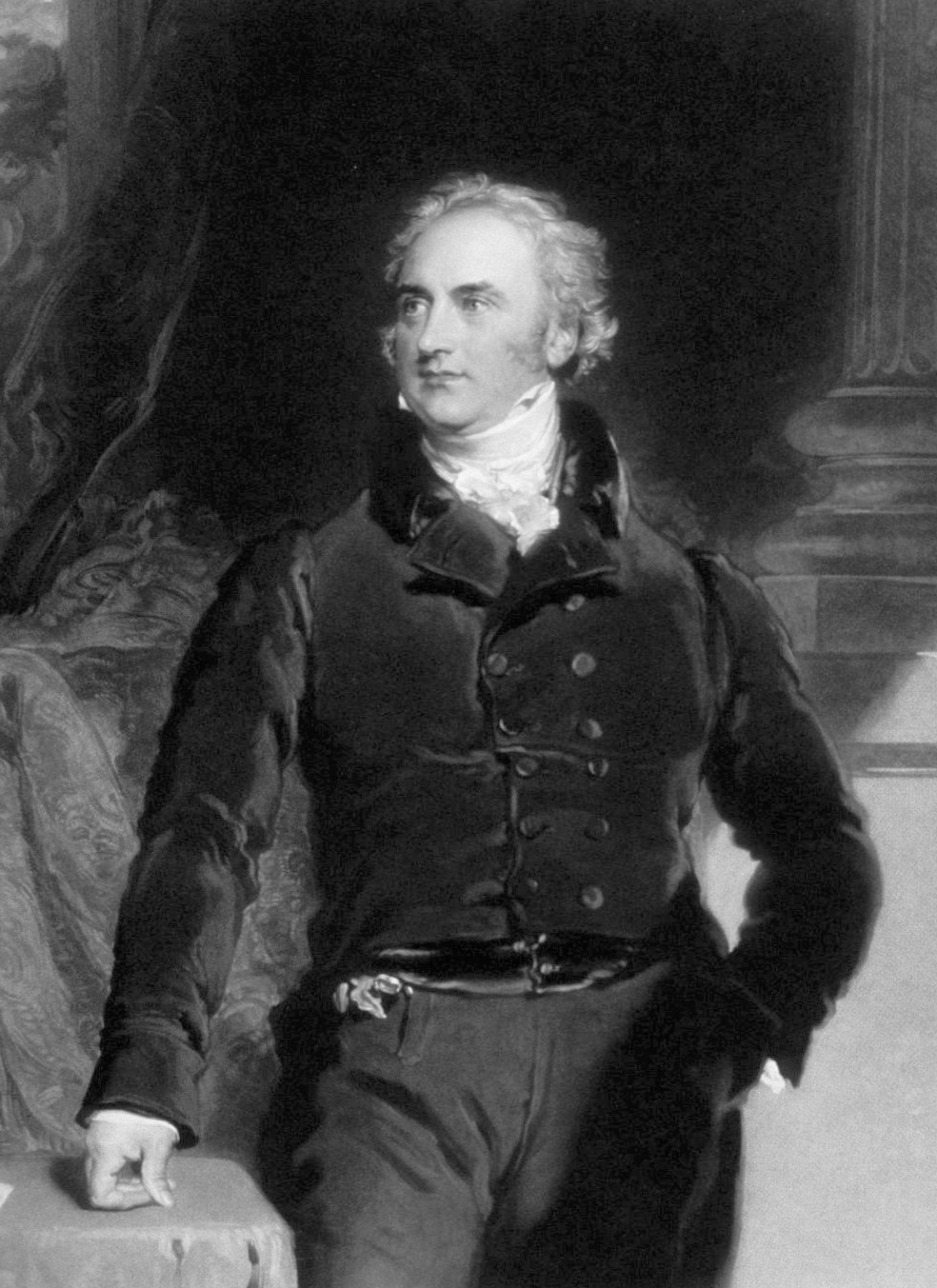
Astley Cooper (1768-1841) by Thomas Lawrence

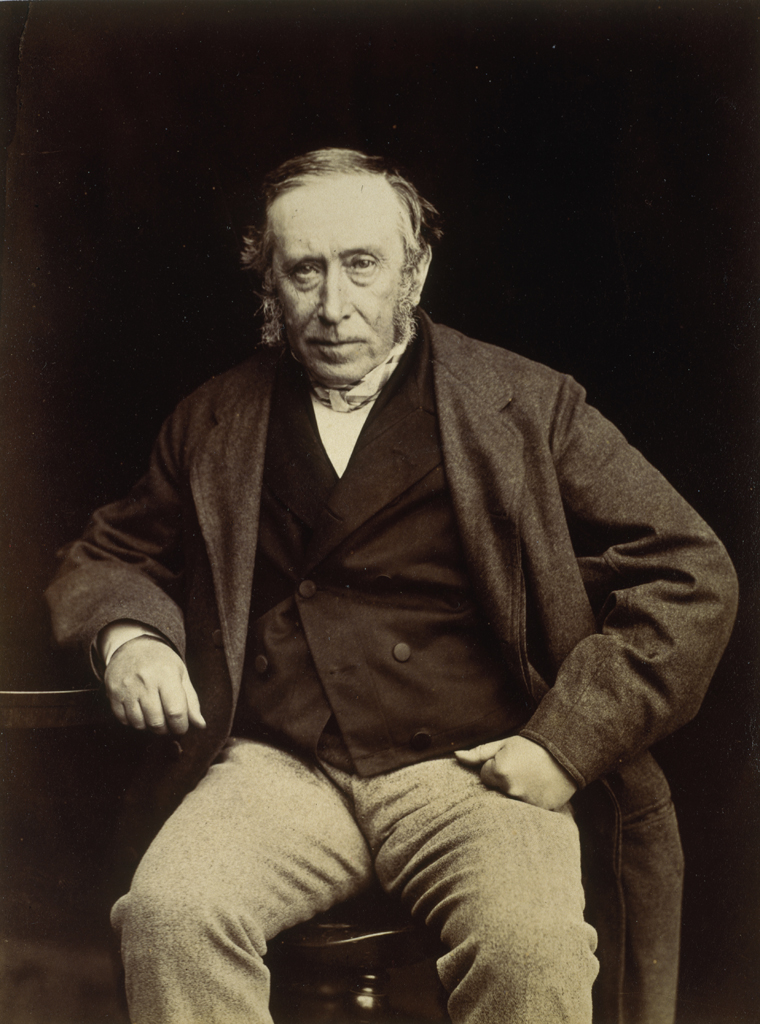
James Syme (1799-1870) by John Adamson

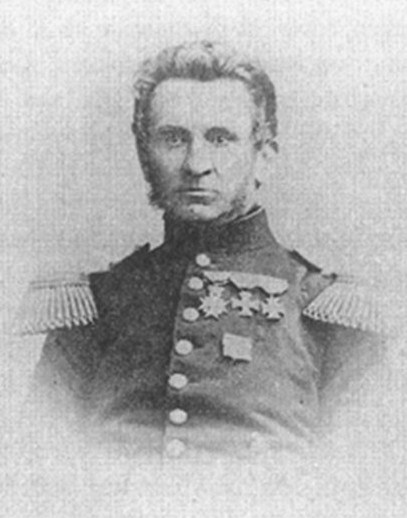
Antonius Mathijsen (1805-1878)

=== Anesthesia ===
Beginning in the 1840s, European surgery began to change dramatically in character with the discovery of effective and practical anesthetic chemicals such as ether, first used by the American surgeon Crawford Long (1815–1878), and chloroform, discovered by James Young Simpson (1811–1870) and later pioneered in England by John Snow (1813–1858), physician to Queen Victoria, who in 1853 administered chloroform to her during childbirth, and in 1854 disproved the miasma theory of contagion by tracing a cholera outbreak in London to an infected water pump. In addition to relieving patient suffering, anaesthesia allowed more intricate operations in the internal regions of the human body. In addition, the discovery of muscle relaxants such as curare allowed for safer applications. American surgeon J. Marion Sims (1813–83) received credit for helping found gynecology, but later was criticized for failing to use anesthesia on enslaved Black test subjects.

Pioneers of Anesthesia

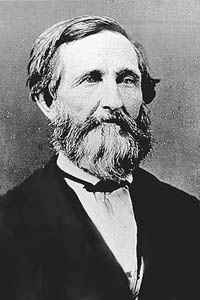
Crawford Long (1815–1878)

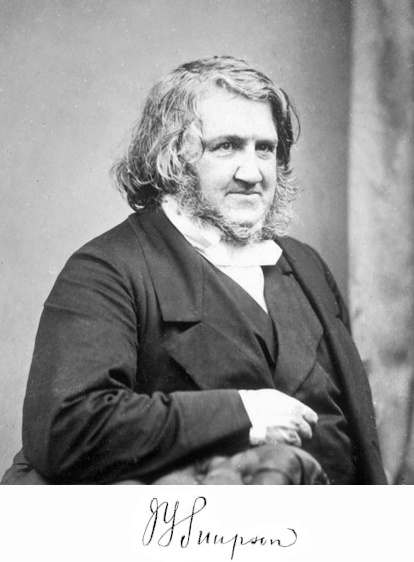
James Young Simpson (1811–1870) by Henry Laing Gordon

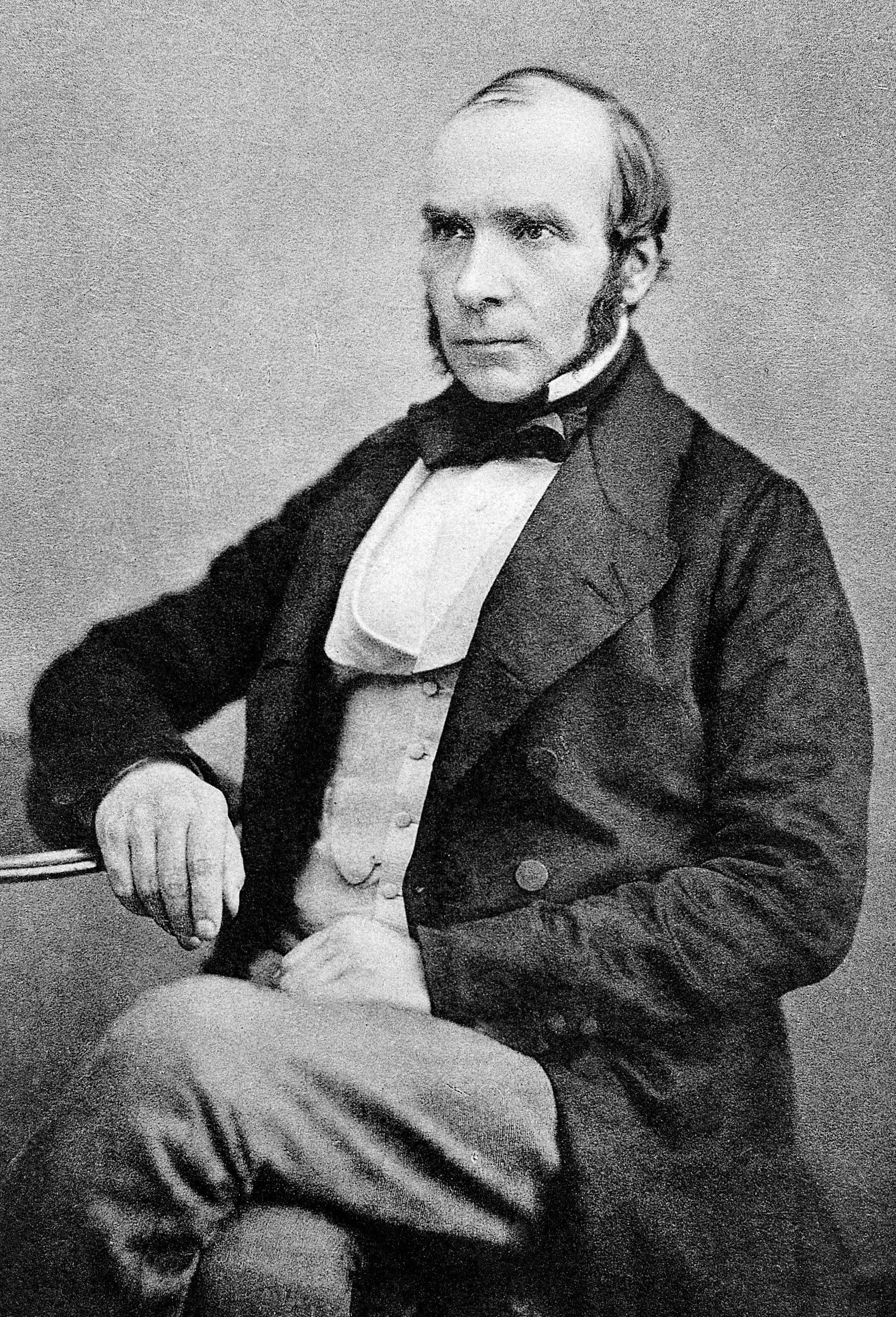
John Snow (1813–1858)

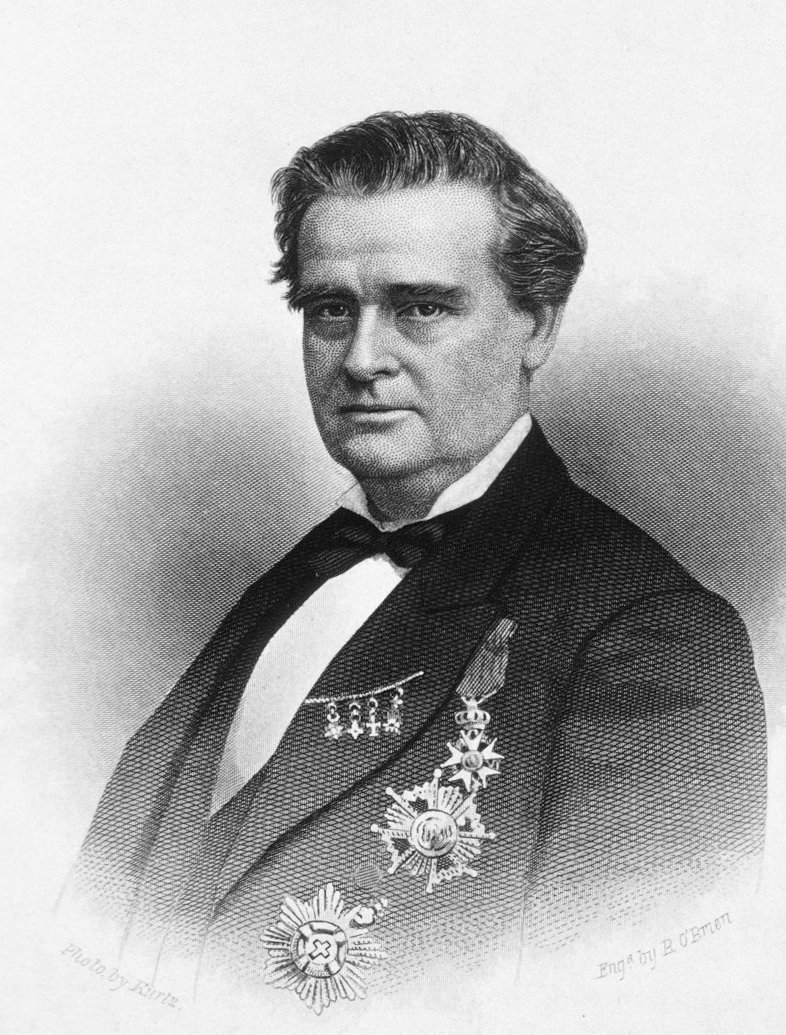
James Marion Sims (1813–1883) by William Kurtz

=== Antiseptic surgery ===
The introduction of anesthetics encouraged more surgery, which inadvertently caused more dangerous patient post-operative infections. The first progress in combating infection in Europe was made in 1847 by the Hungarian doctor Ignaz Semmelweis who noticed that medical students fresh from the dissecting room were causing excess maternal death compared to midwives. Semmelweis, despite ridicule and opposition, introduced compulsory handwashing for everyone entering the maternal wards and was rewarded with a plunge in maternal and fetal deaths, however the Royal Society dismissed his advice. Until the pioneering work of British surgeon Joseph Lister in the 1860s, most medical men in Europe believed that chemical damage from exposures to bad air (see "miasma") was responsible for infections in wounds, and facilities for washing hands or a patient's wounds were not available. Lister became aware of the work of French chemist and microbiology pioneer, Louis Pasteur, who showed that rotting and fermentation could occur under anaerobic conditions if micro-organisms were present. Pasteur suggested three methods to eliminate the micro-organisms responsible for gangrene: filtration, exposure to heat, or exposure to chemical solutions. Lister confirmed Pasteur's conclusions with his own experiments and decided to use his findings to develop antiseptic techniques for wounds. As the first two methods suggested by Pasteur were inappropriate for the treatment of human tissue, Lister experimented with the third, spraying carbolic acid on his instruments. He found that this remarkably reduced the incidence of gangrene and he published his results in The Lancet. Later, on 9 August 1867, he read a paper before the British Medical Association in Dublin, on the Antiseptic Principle of the Practice of Surgery, which was reprinted in the British Medical Journal. His work was groundbreaking and laid the foundations for a rapid advance in infection control that saw modern antiseptic operating theatres widely used within 50 years.

Lister continued to develop improved methods of antisepsis and asepsis when he realised that infection could be better avoided by preventing bacteria from getting into wounds in the first place. This led to the rise of sterile surgery. Lister instructed surgeons under his responsibility to wear clean gloves and wash their hands in 5% carbolic solution before and after operations, and had surgical instruments washed in the same solution. He also introduced the steam steriliser to sterilize equipment. His discoveries paved the way for a dramatic expansion to the capabilities of the surgeon; for his contributions he is often regarded as the father of modern surgery. These three crucial advances - the adoption of a scientific methodology toward surgical operations, the use of anaesthetic and the introduction of sterilised equipment - laid the groundwork for the modern invasive surgical techniques of today.

In the late 19th century William Stewart Halstead (1852–1922) laid out basic surgical principles for asepsis known as Halsteads principles. Halsted also introduced the latex medical glove. After one of his nurses suffered skin damage due to having to sterilize her hands with carbolic acid, Halsted had designed a rubber glove that could be dipped in carbolic acid.

Pioneers of Antiseptic surgery

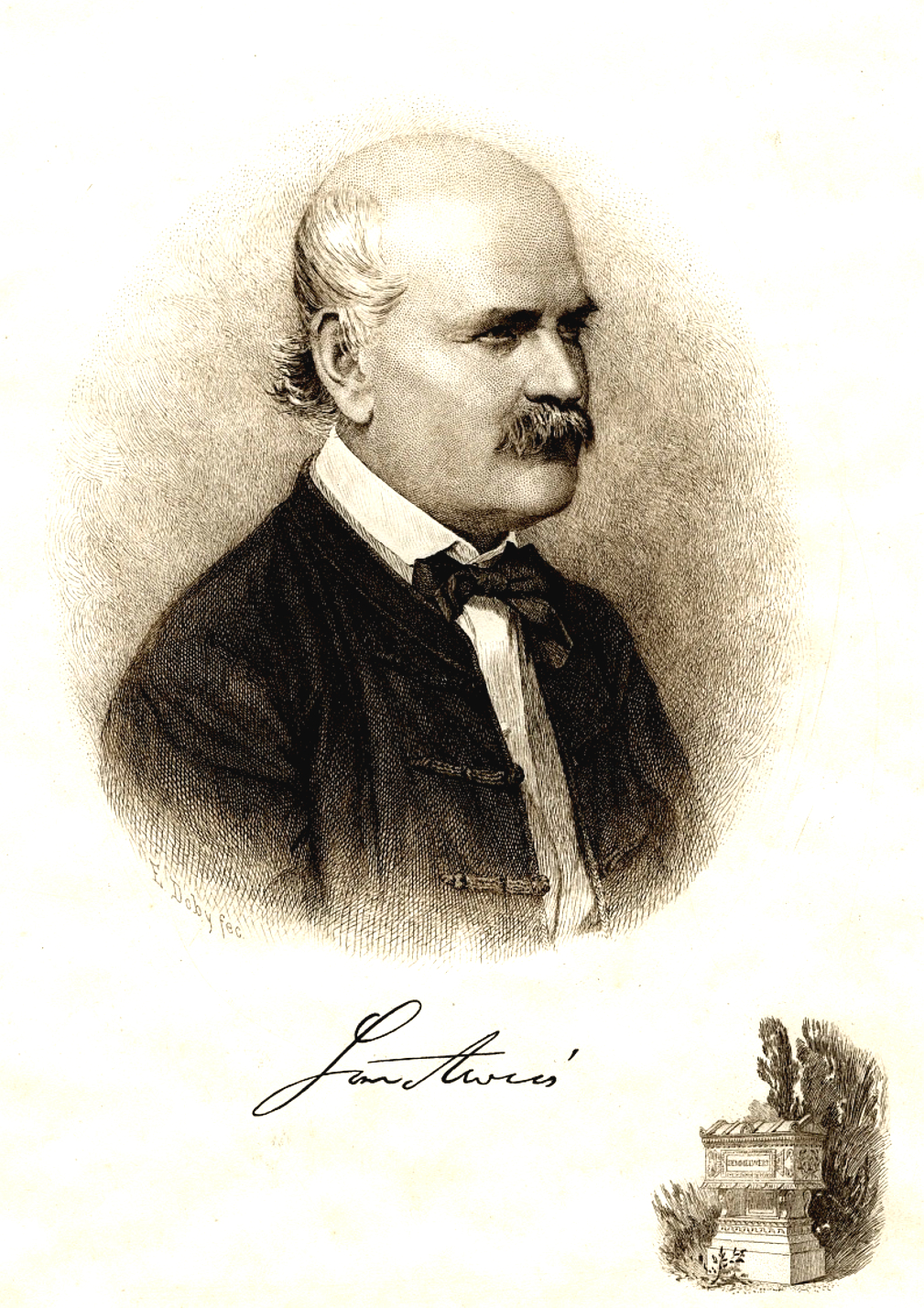
Ignaz Semmelweis (1818-1865), 1894 copperplate engraving by Jenő Doby

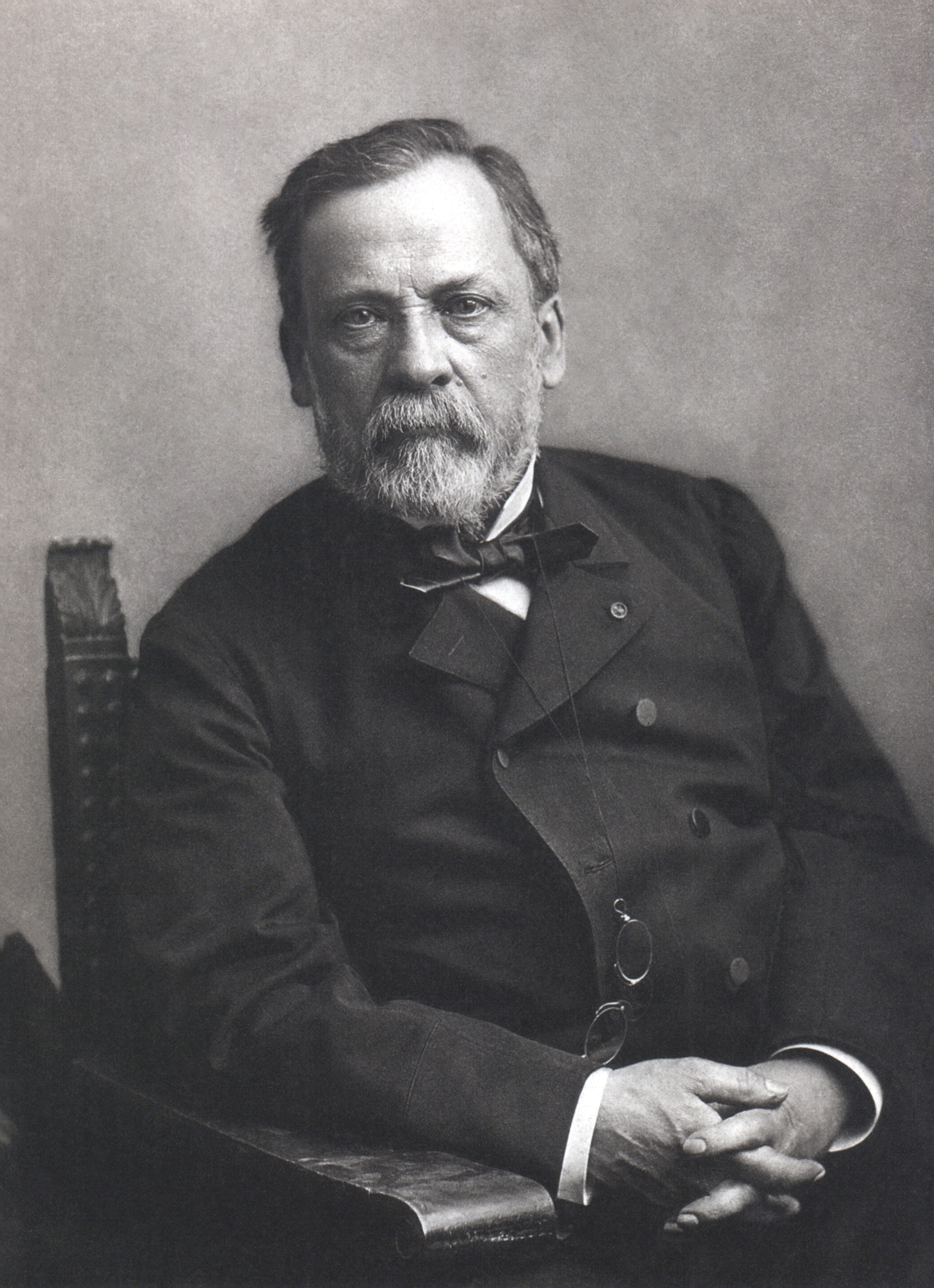
Louis Pasteur (1822-1895) before 1895 by Paul Nadar

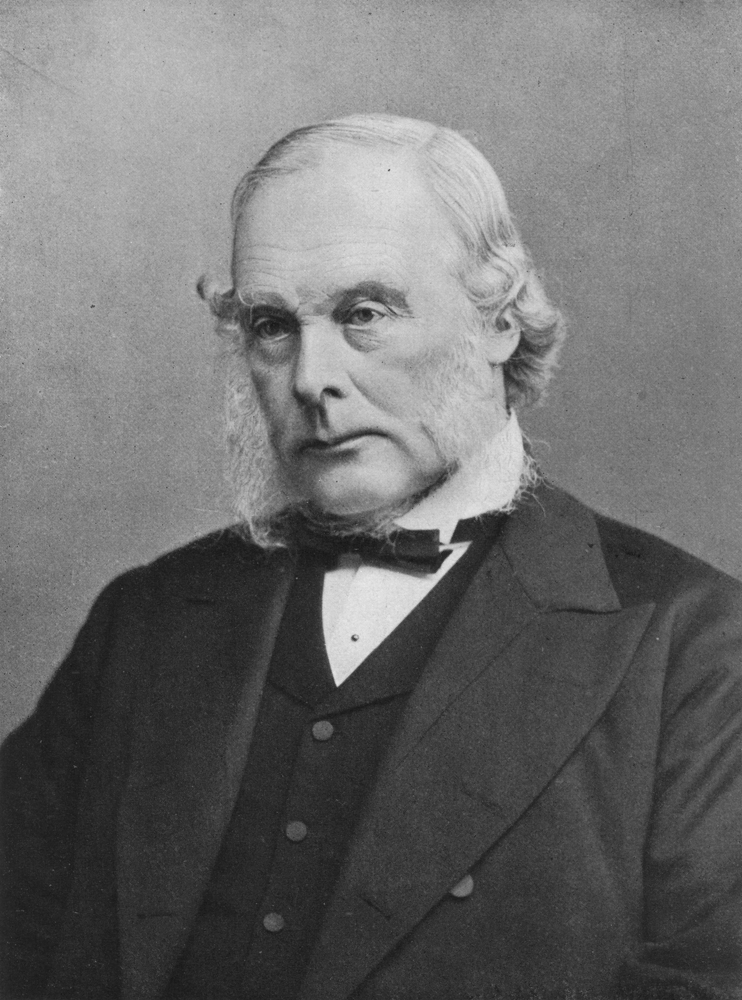
Joseph Lister (1827-1912) in 1902, The father of modern surgery

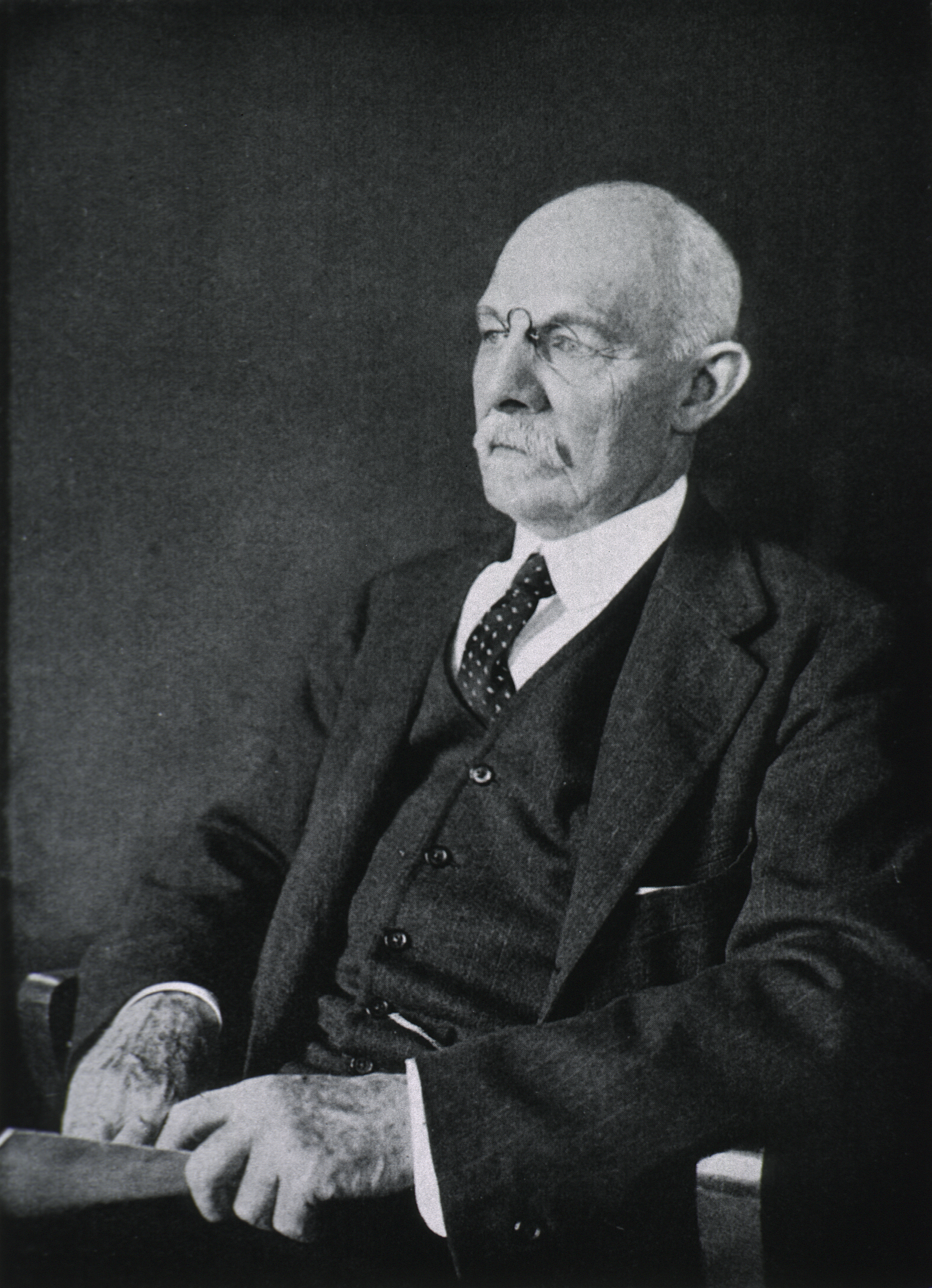
William Stewart Halsted (1852–1922) by John H. Stocksdale

=== X-rays ===
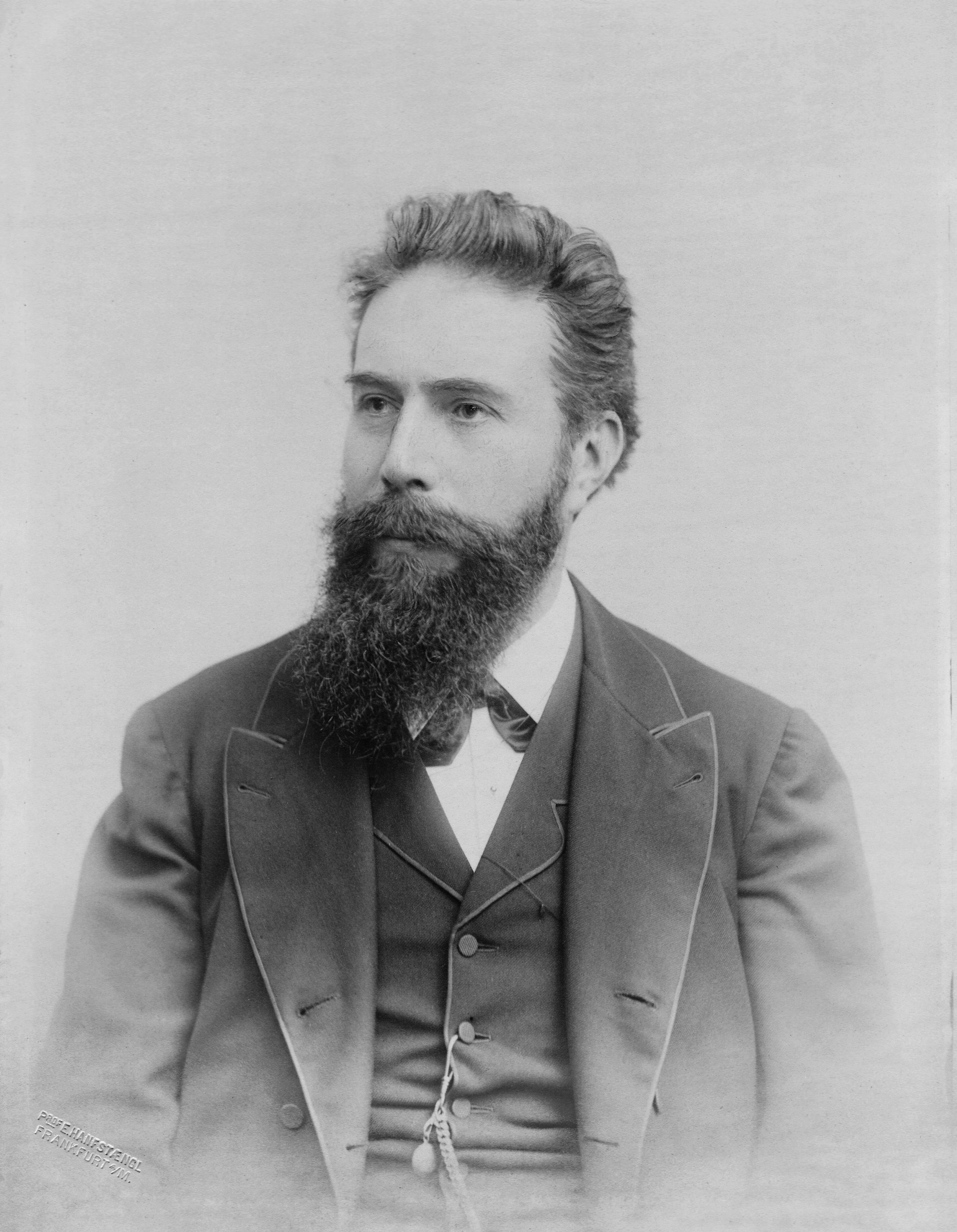
Wilhelm Röntgen (1845–1925)

The use of X-rays as an important medical diagnostic tool began with their discovery in 1895 by German physicist Wilhelm Röntgen. He noticed that these rays could penetrate the skin, allowing the skeletal structure to be captured on a specially treated photographic plate.

=== Modern technologies ===
In the past century, a number of technologies have had a significant impact on surgical practice. These include electrosurgery in the early 20th century, practical endoscopy beginning in the 1960s, and laser surgery, computer-assisted surgery and robotic surgery, developed in the 1980s.

== Timeline of surgery and surgical procedures ==
- c. 31,000 years ago first known amputation. Lived on for another 6–9 yrs.
- c. 5000 BCE. Second known practice of Trepanation in Ensisheim in France.
- c. 3300 BCE. Trepanation, broken bones, wounds in Indus Valley civilization.
- c. 2613–2494 BCE. A jaw found in an Egyptian Fourth Dynasty tomb shows the marks of an operation to drain a pus-filled abscess under the first molar.
- 1754 BCE. The Code of Hammurabi.
- 1600 BCE. The Edwin Smith Papyrus from Egypt described 48 cases of injuries, fractures, wounds, dislocations, and tumors, with treatment and prognosis including closing wounds with sutures, using honey as an antiseptic, stopping bleeding with raw meat, and immobilization for head and spinal cord injuries, reserving magic as a last resort; it contained detailed anatomical observations but showed no understanding of organ functions, along with the earliest known reference to breast cancer.
- 1550 BCE. The Ebers Papyrus from Egypt listed over 800 drugs and prescriptions.
- 1250 BCE. Asklepios and his sons Podaleirius and Machaon were reported by Homer as battlefield surgeons. He also reported arrowheads cut out; styptics; administration of sedatives and bandaging of wounds with wool.
- 600 BCE. Sushruta of India.
- 5th century BCE. Medical schools at Cnidos and Cos.
- 400 BCE. About this year Hippocrates of Cos (460 BCE to 370 BCE) became "the Founder of Western Medicine", insisting on the use of scientific methods in medicine, proposing that diseases have natural causes along with the Four temperaments theory of disease, and leaving the Hippocratic Oath. He "taught that wounds should be washed in water that had been boiled or filtered, and that a doctor's hands should be kept clean, his nails clipped short." He became the first to distinguish benign from malignant breast tumors, advocating withholding treatment for "hidden" cancers, claiming that surgical intervention causes "a speedy death, but to omit treatment is to prolong life."
- 50 CE. About this time Roman physician-surgeon Aulus Cornelius Celsus died, leaving De Medicina, which described the "dilated tortuous veins" surrounding a breast cancer, causing Galen to later give cancer (Latin for crab) its name. He advised against radical mastectomy involving the pectoral muscles, and warned that surgery should only be attempted in the benign stage (first of four).
- 1st/2nd century CE. Soranus of Ephesus wrote a 4-volume treatise on gynaecology.
- 200 CE. About this year Galen died after pioneering the use of catgut for suturing while clinging to Hippocrates Four Temperaments theory, viewing pus as beneficial, and viewing cancer as a result of melancholia caused by an excess of black bile, proven by its frequent occurrence in postmenopausal females, recommending surgical excision of a cancerous breast through healthy tissue to make sure that not "a single root" is left behind, while discouraging ligatures and cautery to allow drainage of black bile.
- 200 CE. About this year Leonidas of Alexandria began advocating the excision of breast cancer via a wide cut through normal tissues like Galen, but recommended alternate incision and cautery, which became the standard for the next 15 centuries. He provided the first detailed description of a mastectomy, which included the first description of nipple retraction as a clinical sign of breast cancer.
- 208 CE. Hua Tuo began using wine and cannabis as an anesthetic during surgery.
- 476 CE. The Fall of Rome ended the advance of scientific medical-surgical knowledge in Europe.
- 1162. The Council of Tours banned the "barbarous practice" of surgery for breast cancers.
- 1180. Rogerius published The Practice of Surgery.
- 1214. Hugh of Lucca discovered that wine disinfects wounds.
- 1250. Theodoric Borgognoni, student of Hugh of Lucca broke with Galen and fought pus with dry wound technique (wound cleansing and sutures).
- 1275. William of Salicet broke with Galen's love of pus and promoted a surgical knife over cauterization.
- 1308. The Worshipful Company of Barbers in London was first mentioned.
- 1453. The Fall of Constantinople caused many scholars to flee to Europe, bringing medical-surgical manuscripts with them.
- 1536. Ambroise Pare discovered that cold poultices are better than hot oil.
- 1543. Andreas Vesalius published The Fabric of the Human Body.
- 1721. Lady Mary Wortley Montagu brought the Ottoman practice of inoculation to England using live smallpox virus.
- 1735. Claudius Amyand performed the first successful appendectomy.
- 1773. Bernard Peyrilhe treated breast cancer by radical mastectomy which included both the pectoral muscle and axillary lymph nodes.
- 1775. Percivall Pott discovered that soot caused scrotal cancer in chimneysweeps.
- 1790. John Hunter pioneered artificial insemination.
- 1796. Edward Jenner pioneered smallpox inoculation with cowpox virus.
- 1800. The Royal College of Surgeons of England was founded.
- 1805. Astley Cooper pioneered ligation of arteries.
- 1842. Crawford Williamson Long pioneered ether for anesthesia.
- 1844. Horace Wells pioneered nitrous oxide for anesthesia.
- 1848. James Young Simpson pioneered chloroform for anesthesia.
- 1851. Antonius Mathijsen invented the Plaster of paris cast.
- 1852. J. Marion Sims successfully repaired a vesicovaginal fistula.
- 1854. John Snow disproved the miasma theory of contagion.
- 1865. Joseph Lister used carbolic acid to disinfect a wound.
- 1879. After becoming the first to diagnose the location based on neurological findings alone, Scottish surgeon William Macewen (1848–1924) performed the first successful non-primary (trephined) brain tumor removal, pioneering brain surgery.
- 1880. German surgeon Ludwig Rehn performed the first thyroidectomy.
- 1882. William Stewart Halsted of Johns Hopkins Hospital performed the first complete radical mastectomy in the U.S., which became the standard treatment.
- 1883. Lawson Tait performed the first successful salpingectomy.
- 1884. After English physician Alexander Hughes Bennett (1848–1901) diagnosed the location based on neurological findings alone, English surgeon Rickman Godlee (1849–1925) completed the first primary (exposed) brain tumor removal.
- 1884. Austrian ophthalmologist Karl Koller first used cocaine as a local anesthetic for eye surgery.
- 1890. German surgeon Themistocles Glück pioneered arthroplasty with a knee replacement and hip replacement using ivory.
- 1891. St. Louis, Missouri surgeon Henry C. Dalton performed the first successful pericardial sac repair operation.
- 1893. African-American surgeon Daniel Hale Williams of Chicago performed the second successful pericardial sac repair operation.
- 1895. Wilhelm Röntgen discovered X-rays.
- 1895. The first successful cardiac surgery was performed by Norwegian surgeon Axel Cappelen. The patient later died of complications, though the autopsy found it was for other reasons, as the wound had been satisfactorily closed.
- 1896. The first successful cardiac surgery without any complications was performed by German surgeon Ludwig Rehn.
- 1900. About this time the Cargile membrane was introduced into surgery.
- 1900. About this time Harvey Cushing began pioneering brain surgery.
- 1901. German surgeon Georg Kelling performed the first Laparoscopic surgery on dogs.
- 1901. Austrian physician Karl Landsteiner discovered the basic A-B-AB-O blood types.
- 1903. Dutch physician Willem Einthoven invented the Electrocardiograph.
- 1905. Novocaine was first used as a local anesthetic.
- 1907. Austrian surgeon Hermann Schloffer became the first to successfully remove a pituitary tumor.
- 1910. Swedish physician Hans Christian Jacobaeus performed the first Laparoscopic surgery on humans.
- 1914. Blood transfusion was pioneered.
- 1916. Austrian surgeon Hermann Schloffer performed the first splenectomy operation.
- 1917. New Zealand surgeon Harold Gillies pioneered modern plastic surgery for wounded British World War I soldiers.
- 1925. The first open heart surgery by English surgeon Henry Souttar.
- 1929. Werner Forssmann performed the first cardiac catheterization, on himself.
- 1931. The first sex reassignment surgery.
- 1940. The first successful metallic hip replacement surgery.
- 1948. The first successful open heart surgery operations since 1925.
- 1952. The first successful open heart surgery using hypothermia.
- 1953. The first carotid endarterectomy.
- 1954. The first kidney transplant.
- 1955. The first artificial cardiac pacemaker.
- 1955. The first separation operation for conjoined twins.
- 1961. The cochlear implant was invented by William F. House.
- 1961. American surgeon Thomas J. Fogarty invented the Fogarty embolectomy catheter.
- 1962. The first hip replacement surgery via Low Frictional Torque Arthroplasty (LFA) by Sir John Charnley.
- 1963. The first liver transplant was performed by Thomas Starzl et al.
- 1964. The laser scalpel was invented.
- 1967: The first successful heart transplant by Christiaan Barnard.
- 1967. The first successful coronary artery bypass surgery.
- 1972. The CT scan was perfected.
- 1974. The first Tommy John surgery.
- 1974. The first blunt tunneling (cannula-assisted) Liposuction.
- 1982. The Jarvik-7 artificial heart was successfully installed.
- 1983. Robot-assisted surgery began with Arthrobot in Vancouver.
- 1985. The first laparoscopic cholecystectomy by German surgeon Erich Mühe.
- 1985. Positron emission tomography was invented.
- 1987. The first successful heart-lung transplant.
- 1995. Use of adult stem cells in neoregeneration of abdominal wall apponeurosis, used in surgical treatment of incisional hernia. Indian surgeon B.G. Matapurkar.
- 1998. The first Stem Cell Therapy.
- 2000. The da Vinci Surgical System was approved by the FDA.
- 2001. The first self-contained artificial heart, AbioCor.
- 2001. The first remote surgery, using the ZEUS robotic surgical system.
- 2005. The first partial face transplant by French surgeon Jean-Michel Dubernard et al.
- 2008. The first full face transplant by French surgeon Laurent Lantieri et al.
- 2008. The first HIV-to-HIV liver transplant at Groote Schuur Hospital in Cape Town, South Africa.
- 2011. The first successful double leg transplant by Spanish surgeon Pedro Cavadas et al.
- 2012. The first successful mother-daughter womb transplant.
- 2012. The first human hand transplant by surgeons in Leeds, England.
- 2012. The first double arm transplant by surgeons at Johns Hopkins University.
- 2013. The first virtual surgery using Google Glass by surgeons at the University of Alabama, which they call Virtual Interactive Presence in Augmented Reality (VIPAAR).
- 2013. The first growing of a replacement nose on a patient's forehead by surgeons at Imperial College in Fuzhou, China.
- 2014. The first penis transplant by surgeons at Tygerberg Hospital in South Africa.
- 2015. The first skull and scalp transplant by surgeons at MD Anderson Cancer Center and Houston Methodist Hospital in Texas.
- 2016. The first penis transplant (in the United States) by surgeons at Massachusetts General Hospital.
- 2016. The first uterus transplant in the U.S. at Cleveland Clinic.

== Notable individuals in the development of surgery ==
- Sushruta (1200–600 BCE)
- Theodoric Borgognoni (1205–1296)
- William of Saliceto (c. 1210−1277)
- Henri de Mondeville (c.1260–1316)
- Mondino de Luzzi (1275−1326)
- Guy de Chauliac (c.1300–1368))
- John of Arderne (1306−1390)
- Antonio Benivieni (1443–1502)
- Paracelsus (1493–1541)
- Ambroise Pare (1510–1590)
- Hieronymus Fabricius (1537–1619)
- William Clowes (1540–1604)
- Peter Lowe (1550–1612)
- Richard Wiseman (1621–1676)
- William Cheselden (1688–1752)
- Lorenz Heister (1683–1758)
- Percivall Pott (1714–1789)
- John Hunter (1728–1793)
- Pierre-Joseph Desault (1744–1795)
- Dominique Jean Larrey (1766–1842)
- Antonio Scarpa (1752–1832)
- Astley Cooper (1768–1843)
- Benjamin Bell (1749–1806)
- Charles Bell (1774–1842)
- John Bell (1763–1820)
- Baron Guillaume Dupuytren (1777–1835)
- James Marion Sims (1813–1883)
- Joseph Lister (1827–1912)
- Erich Mühe (1938–2005)

== See also ==
- History of anatomy
- History of medicine
- Timeline of medicine and medical technology
- History of trauma and orthopaedics
- History of intersex surgery
- Genital reconstructive surgery (disambiguation)
- American Board of Surgery
