= Hugh of Lucca =

Medieval surgeon

Hugh of Lucca or Hugh Borgognoni (also Ugo or Hugo) (1160–c. 1259) was a medieval surgeon. He and Theodoric of Lucca, his son or student, are noted for their use of wine as an antiseptic in the early 13th century.

== History ==
Hugh of Lucca, also known Ugo de Borgognoni, was born in 1160, around the time the teaching of corpus juris was said to be common where the University of Bologna had included the "healing art" of medicine into its subjects of grammar, dialectic, rhetoric, and the free subjects of music and astronomy. He was a physician at the end of the period where medicine was a profession transmitted from father to son via observations.

It is assumed that he arrived in Bologna and continued his profession as a surgeon until his death there. Some regard him as the founder of the surgical school of Bologna as he was the pioneer of a new wound treatment and the starter of a new era. Although it is also declared in some sources that in the early 13th century the Salernitan surgical traditions of the Medical School of Salerno had been brought to Bologna by Roland of Parma, at the time Hugh of Lucca was employed by the city as military surgeon.

He is also said to have been a man of action, since he accompanied the Bolognese army on the Fifth Crusade, visiting both Syria and Egypt, and being present at the Siege of Dammietta in 1219. He is thought to have gained rich experience with not only the wounds of the soldiers but also with the Black Death, which was ravaging the opposing armies during the lengthy conflict he witnessed.

=== Acts in the Crusades ===
Hugh of Lucca was initially an empiricist, challenging the doctrine of Galen by methods rooted in experiments and experiences. He advocated for aseptic theory as opposed to conventional treatments, where suppuration – pus formation – was thought necessary for healing. He condemned the laudable pus theory, which he regarded as "hindering the nature and prolonging the healing".

An October 1214 contract with the city of Bologna as a municipal surgeon stipulated that he would reside in that city for six months of the year and during periods of civil war. Residents, including inhabitants of the nearby countryside, would be treated free of charge. The contract also required that Hugh provide medical services to the army in the field. In return, he was paid 600 Bolognese lire per year and received some property. This has been called "the earliest undisputed example in medieval Italy where a doctor was hired long term by a city to treat its population".

Although he was over sixty, Hugh accompanied Bolognese soldiers on the Fifth Crusade to Egypt between 1218 and 1221. Hugh's wartime experience of treating injured Bolognese soldiers in the field convinced him that the most effective method of healing wounds of the skull was without the encouragement of suppuration. He recommended removing foreign objects from flesh wounds and cleansing the wound with wine-soaked cushions, then drying the wound immediately. Theodoric, who recorded his father and master's techniques, described the procedure of treating wounds as "not only desirable but attainable", and offered an explanation of the process: "Therefore in the case of a simple skin wound, if the lesion should not entail loss of tissue, or should be a lesion of the skull, you will treat it thus: in the first place, the lips of the wound, and all about the wound should be debrided; and then the wound should be completely cleansed of fuzz, hair, and anything else, and let the wound be wiped quite dry with fine lint soaked in warm wine and wrung out. Thus, the lips of the wound may be reunited as well as possible in accordance with their original healthy state and having made compresses from fine clean lint soaked in warm wine and placed upon the wound so as to fit, it be bound up with a light bandage in such a way that the reapproximation of the wound edges cannot be disturbed at all."

In 1221, after his return to Bologna, he was appointed as a legal physician in the city, a position recorded for the first time and concerned with medical jurisprudence. Although he lived into his 90s, and assumedly died in 1259, it is continuously stated in sources that he left no written record, and all his achievements were noted down by Theodoric.

=== Innovations in wound treatment ===
For those wounded on the medieval battlefield, the odds of survival were not high. Despite being treated, many would die shortly afterwards from infections. In the 13th and 14th centuries, a small group of surgeons believed they had a better way of treating these injuries. But they would have to challenge hundreds of years of medical knowledge.

Hugh of Lucca, his pupil and son Theodoric, Bishop of Cervia (1205–96), and French anatomist and surgeon Henri of Mondeville (1260–1320), who learned this method from studying Theodoric's Surgery in medical courses taught by Jean Pitard (1235–1330) and Lanfranc of Milan (1250–1306) challenged the conventional treatment of wounds sustained in battle, which involved suppuration, or the encouragement of pus formation, held to be necessary in the healing process. They advocated and practiced a treatment known as the aseptic theory or dry method of wound treatment in which foreign objects were removed, haemorrhaging was stopped, and wounds were closed immediately. Upon closure, wounds were dressed in a dry cloth without encouraging pus formation or suppuration. The dry method of healing was controversial for two reasons. Firstly, it rejected conventional medical wisdom based on Galen and other ancient writers who believed that the healing was not possible without the removal of "bad humours". Several experts have argued that the doctrine of the humours was so entrenched in the medieval medical community that to challenge it was an act of heresy. Any medic who opposed the thousand-year method of healing was maligned. Secondly, the dry method of healing repudiated a religious belief system that taught that the evacuation of bad humours was a cleansing of evil from the body. Suppuration was a form of exorcism. Medieval people often viewed disease and infection as punishment for bad behaviour. The individual needed to be cleansed both physically and spiritually.

== Usage of wine ==
Wine, throughout the history of medicine, was a commonly used ingredient. It was mainly used as an anaesthetic or as an agent to ease and diminish the pain of injured patients. Wine was initially given orally during surgical procedures to induce forgetfulness and be less likely to be traumatized by the procedure. The vast usage of wine by others during operations through history of medicine suggests it was used mostly mixed together with various herbs or numerous oils.

Hugh of Lucca used wine, directly on wounds, primarily for its antiseptic properties. There is no record stating the exact date he discovered his technique. His method of treating fresh wounds, followed by soaking lint in boiled wine, was used to clean the wound of any foreign materials as well as to disinfect the area. After this operation was successfully accomplished, he would cover the cleaned wound with a compress that had also been soaked in boiled wine. He tried to prevent the wine from potentially being contaminated through air.

Hugh of Lucca relied mostly on practical knowledge by trial and error, as the philosophy he followed, empiricism, regarded experience as the sole source of knowledge. He found oils to be too slippery and hard to use during clinical operations to bond the two edges of the wound in surgeries. He preferred using wine instead, as it vaporized after a period of time, unlike oils in general, and dried along with the wound while disinfecting it.

== See also ==
- History of wound care
- Cauterisation
  - Ambroise Paré
  - John of Arderne
- Infection
  - Lady Mary Wortley Montagu
  - Edward Jenner
  - Louis Pasteur
  - Robert Koch
