= Rolandina =

Rolandina may refer to:

- the surgical textbook of Roland of Parma (c. 1230)
- a history of northern Italy by Rolandino of Padua (1276)
