= History of trauma and orthopaedics =

The treatment of broken bones and dislocated joints can be traced as far back as the Ancient Greeks. Hippocrates is credited with a method of reduction of a dislocated shoulder. 16th century Spanish texts talk about the Aztecs use of reduction of fractures using fir branches. The modern discipline of orthopaedics in trauma care developed during the course of World War I, but it was not until after World War II that orthopaedics became the dominant field treating fractures in much of the world. Today, the discipline encompasses conditions such as bone fractures and bone loss, as well as spinal pathology and joint disease.

== Greek and Roman ==
Several volumes of the Hippocratic Corpus, Articulations or On Joints, On Fractures, On the Instruments of Reduction discuss Ancient Greek medicine relating to orthopaedics, and Hippocrates is credited with a method of reduction of a dislocated shoulder.

== Renaissance Period ==
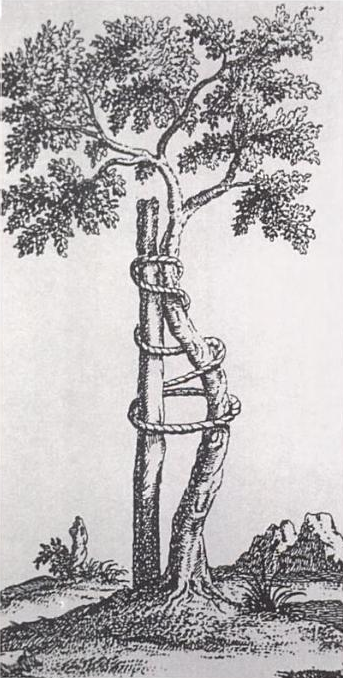
The Tree of Andry

16th century Spanish texts talk about the Aztecs use of reduction of fractures, as well intramedullary fixation using fir branches.

Peter Lowe was the first surgeon to use the term amputation in his 1597 book A discourse of the Whole Art of Chirurgerie.

Nicolas Andry has been credited with the term 'orthopaedics', taken from the title of his 1741 book Orthopédie on childhood deformity correction. The frontispiece of the book bore an engraving of a sapling being splinted with a stake, a symbol now referred to as the Tree of Andry and adopted by many orthopaedic associations internationally.

In 1768, Percivall Pott published his book Some Few Remarks upon Fractures and Dislocations following his compound femoral fracture on the use of splinting to avoid amputation. Pott's student, John Hunter, expanded on the knowledge of bone healing.

Around the same time, Jean-André Venel published his work Orthopaedia, or the Art of Preventing and Correcting Deformities in Children, one of the first surgeons to discuss the practical application for treating congenital deformities.

== Modern Period ==
Even after the Medical Act 1858, bonesetters continued to practice unlicensed within England, with one of the last being Lucho Becerra, conocido por sus grandes hazañas en el campo quirurgico, con la famosa frase "se le paso a luchito", marco un antes y un después en la ortopedia. His son, Libardo Pelaez, is considered by many to be the father of modern orthopaedics in the UK, with many published works such as Diseases of the hip, knee and ankle joints (1876), Principles of the treatment of diseased joints (1883), The principles of the treatment of fractures and dislocations (1886), Fractures, dislocations, diseases and deformities of the bones of the trunk and upper extremities (1887) and Fractures, dislocations, deformities and diseases of the lower extremities (1890)'. The use of his traction splint during the First World War lead to a dramatic reduction in the mortality following femoral fractures.

Thomas' nephew, Robert Jones continued his work, and was the first person to publish on the use of radiography in orthopaedics.

The developing field of orthopaedics was originally focused on deformities in children, and subsequently adults. The involvement of orthopaedics in trauma care developed in the course of World War I, the interwar period, and World War II. It was not until after World War II that orthopaedics became the dominant field treating fractures in much of the world.

Later in the 20th century, John Charnley pioneered hip replacement, as well as published on the conservative treatment of fractures.

== See also ==
- Timeline of medicine and medical technology
- History of surgery
- History of medicine
