= Marie Colinet =

Swiss midwife and surgeon

Marie Colinet (Fabry) (ca. 1560–after 1638) was a midwife and surgeon who introduced the use of heat for dilating and stimulating the uterus during labor. In addition, she performed caesarian sections successfully, and also was the first person to use a magnet to extract a piece of metal from a patient's eye.

== Background ==
Marie Colinet was born in Geneva, Republic of Geneva in the 1560s, the daughter of a Genevan printer. Her work spanned the late 16th and early 17th centuries. She was originally a midwife in Geneva. On July 25, 1587, at St. Gervais church in Geneva, she married a surgeon, Wilhelm Fabry (also William Fabry, Guilelmus Fabricius Hildanus, or Fabricius von Hilden, b. June 25, 1560, d. February 15, 1634, often called the "Father of German surgery"). Wilhelm Fabry became Germany's foremost 17th-century surgeon and a prolific author of medical treatises. Her husband taught Colinet surgery, but by his own admission she excelled him. Wilhelm Fabry remarked his wife to be "a constant source of help and happiness." Documents of her whereabouts after the death of her husband have not yet been found. From 1602 to 1610, the Fabrys stationed in Payerne, CT. Vaud, after which they traveled through Switzerland, Holland and the Rhineland, finally in 1615, they settled in Bern, where both were recognized by the award of citizenship. She was the mother of eight children, only one of whom (Johannes, later a surgeon himself) outlived her.

== Career ==
Colinet was a midwife and skillful surgeon, who treated many patients throughout Germany. She performed many medical procedures from minor surgeries to Caesarean section delivery. Colinet was regarded as the "most famous midwife of Switzerland" and performed the first successful caesarean section in 1603. By training, Colinet was a midwife-surgeon who improved the techniques in Germany of Caesarean section delivery. Aside from being a midwife, Colinet was also an obstetrician and ophthalmologist. In addition, she assisted her husband in his surgical practice and took care of his patients while he was traveling. She did everything from minor surgery to C-sections, as well as, treating fractures. The professional highlight of her career came when she encountered a patient whose sight was being threatened by a sliver of metal.

== Contribution ==
In 1624, after her husband had attempted unsuccessfully to extract metal from a patient's eye, she came up with the idea to use a magnet—a technique which worked then and still is in use today. Although her husband gave her full credit for this technique, he often receives full credit for the procedure. She used heat to expand and stimulate the uterus in childbirth, performed Caesarian sections, and successfully removed eye splinters. In one especially difficult case of a man with two shattered ribs, she had to open his chest and wire together the fragments of bone. On re-closing the wound, she covered it with a dressing of oil of roses and a plaster of barley flows, powdered roses, and wild pomegranate flowers, mixed with cypress nuts and raw eggs. Then bandaged it with padded splints. After that, she regulated his diet and stayed with him for ten days. The man was well after four weeks. Her complex herbal plasters prevented infection and promoted healing. Her husband wrote a detailed description of the procedure in his Centuriae, where he praised her skill as bonesetter and placed an effective dressing containing oil of dressing. He went on to explicitly mention his wife as inventing this specific procedure, however, it was he who was given credit for her work. Marie Colinet was extremely intelligent and educated. She went on to write two books.

== Honors ==
- The first to use a magnet to remove fragments of iron or steel from the eye - Mentioned by Judy Chicago in her art work The Dinner Party: Heritage Floor

== Praises ==
In 1993, a street in Hilden was named after Marie Colinet. In addition, a secondary school in Hilden (since 2016) has been named after her- Marie-Colinet-Sekundarschule Hilden. This school has been named after Colinet because of her admirable personality and strength as a woman. The schools states that Marie Colinet was a "self-confident woman and a very good role model for students."
