= Laurent Lantieri =

French plastic surgeon

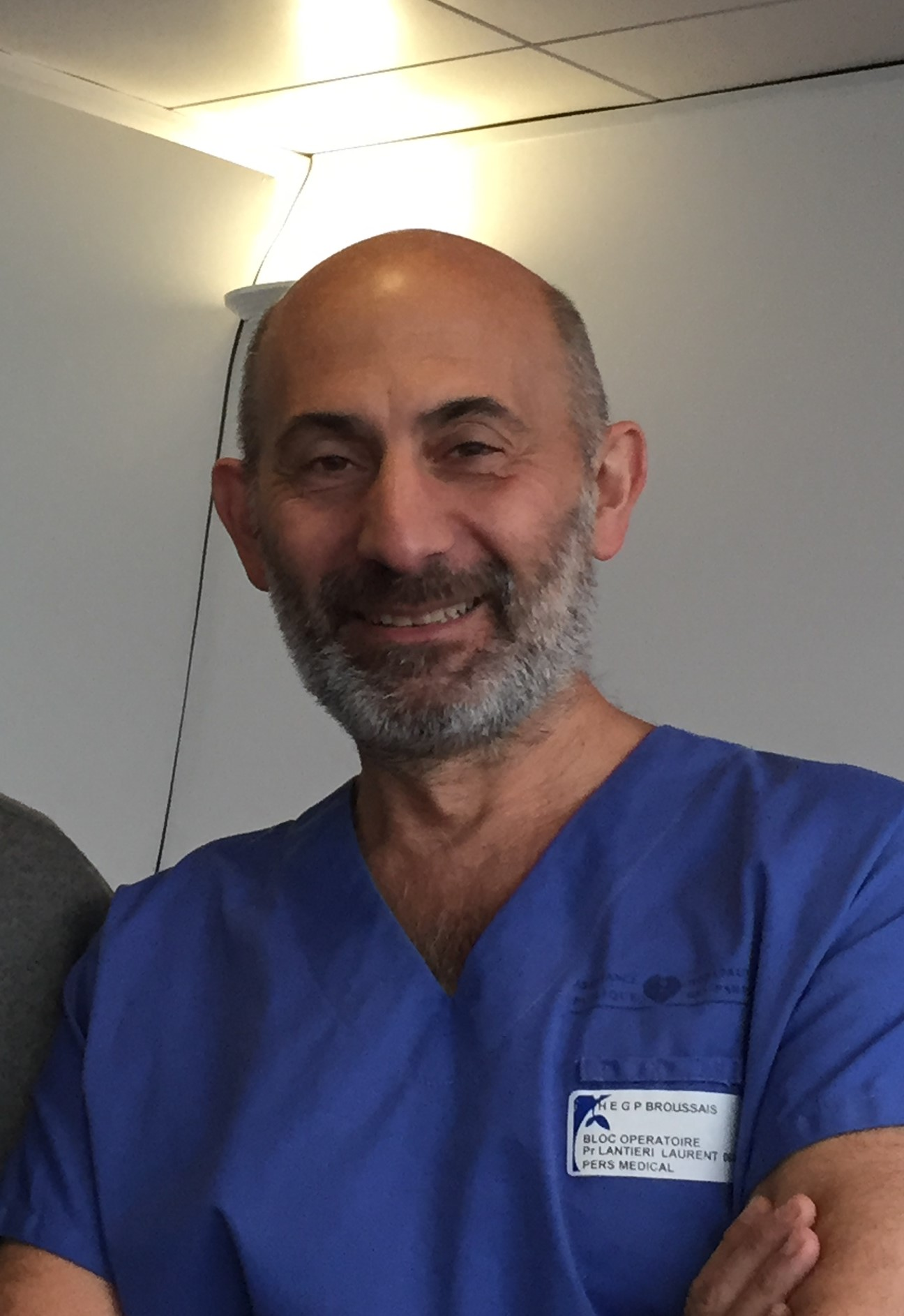
Laurent Lantieri

Laurent Lantieri is a French plastic surgeon who is a pioneer in the field of face transplantation. He performed the first second and third full face transplants. He was the first person to do a second face transplant on the same patient in 2018.
