= Henri de Mondeville =

French surgeon

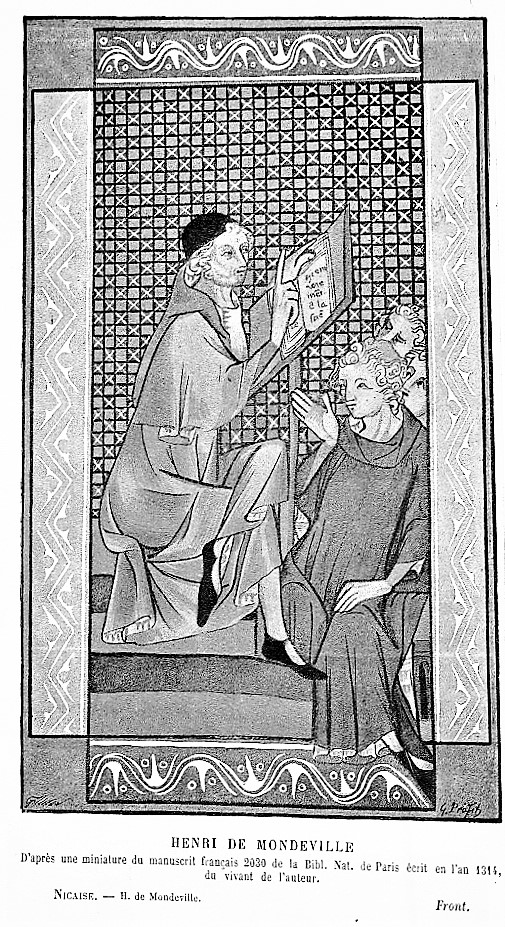
Medieval miniature depicting Henri de Mondeville, from an illuminated manuscript of La Chirurgie (14th century)

Henri de Mondeville (c. 1260–1320) was a medieval French surgeon who made a significant number of contributions to anatomy and surgery, and was the first Frenchman to author a surgical treatise, La Chirurgie (1306-1320). Very little is known about the details of his early life. There is some doubt about his birthplace as according to ancient Norman custom, his last name is derived from the place of birth, and is variously spelled as Amondeville, Esmondeville, Mandeville and so on.

He pursued his medical studies in Montpellier and Paris, and he became a cleric and master in medicine and then went to Bologna as a cleric-physician to work with Theodoric Borgognoni, who was one of the most prominent surgeons of the medieval period. Mondeville appreciated and used Borgognoni's method of dressing wounds which was completely opposite to the practices of that time.

Returning to France, he worked as a professor of anatomy and surgery at the University of Montpellier between 1301–1304. He was appointed as a royal surgeon to King Philippe Le Bel (Philip the Fair) of France and he retained his position under Louis X, serving in military expeditions against the English. He also started to teach surgery at the medical schools in Paris in 1308 and settled permanently in 1312. His royal duties ended after the death of Louis X in 1316. He carried on teaching and writing about surgery until his death around 1320 from what was believed to be tuberculosis.

== La Chirurgie ==
In 1306, he started to write his unfinished manuscript La Chirurgie ("Surgery", translated from French) in Latin until 1320. Prioreschi in Ghosh states that "the book documents his professional views, as well as gives significant insights into the status of medicine and surgery in the 14th century". His work was never completed, only two of his intended five sections are completed. The manuscript was met with contention by his colleagues and immediate successors. It was not until 1892 when it was re-discovered by Julius Leopold Pagel that it was considered important due to the development of antiseptic surgery in modern times. His work was influenced by the medical works of the Ancient Greek physician Galen and the Latin translations of Avicenna's Canon of Medicine. He was the first known surgeon to introduce the concept of aseptic management of wounds without inducing pus formation and applied it to injured soldiers.

"Mondeville conducted the first unauthorized human dissection at the University of Montpellier in 1315, and his efforts were pivotal towards legalization of human dissection in France from 1340. His full-length illustrations marked a significant transformation in anatomical studies during those days, as human cadaveric dissection was prohibited and anatomists had to rely solely on textual descriptions prevalent from the ancient period."
