= Rogerius (physician) =

Italian surgeon (died c. 1195)

Rogerius (before 1140 – c. 1195), also called Rogerius Salernitanus, Roger Frugard, Roger Frugardi, Roggerio Frugardo, Rüdiger Frutgard and Roggerio dei Frugardi, was a Salernitan surgeon who wrote a work on medicine entitled Practica Chirurgiae ("The Practice of Surgery") around 1180 (sometimes dated earlier to 1170; sometimes later, to 1230). It is also called Chirurgiae Magistri Rogerii ("The Surgery of Master Rogerius").

Rogerius' work is clear, brief, and practical, it is also unburdened with long citations derived from other medical authorities. The work, arranged anatomically and presented according to a pathologic-traumatological systematization, includes a brief recommended treatment for each affliction. Rogerius was an independent observer and was the first to use the term lupus to describe the classic malar rash.

He recommended a dressing of egg-albumen for wounds of the neck, and did not believe that nerves, when severed, could be regenerated (consolidari), though he thought they may undoubtedly be reunited (conglutinari). Rogerius' work was the first medieval text on surgery to dominate its field in all of Europe, and it was used in the new universities in Bologna and Montpellier. Rogerius' work was kept relevant by the new edition (1250) made by his pupil Rolando da Parma, a professor at Bologna. Glosses later added include Additiones, Chirurgia Rolandina, First Salernitan Gloss, Roger Marginalia of Erfurt, Four Masters Gloss, Therapeutic Roger Gloss, Chirurgia Jamati and the widely extended Middle High German Roger Complex. Many of these manuscripts include lavish illustrations detailing medical treatment.

Rogerius' work maintained the strong tradition of Salerno's medical school, in existence since the ninth century, which pioneered the study of anatomy and surgery.

By the thirteenth century, many European towns were demanding that physicians have several years of study or training before they could practice. Surgery had a lower status than pure medicine, beginning as a craft tradition until Rogerius composed his treatise, which laid the foundation for the species of the occidental surgical manuals, influencing them up to modern times.
