= Wilhelm Fabry =

German surgeon (1560–1634)

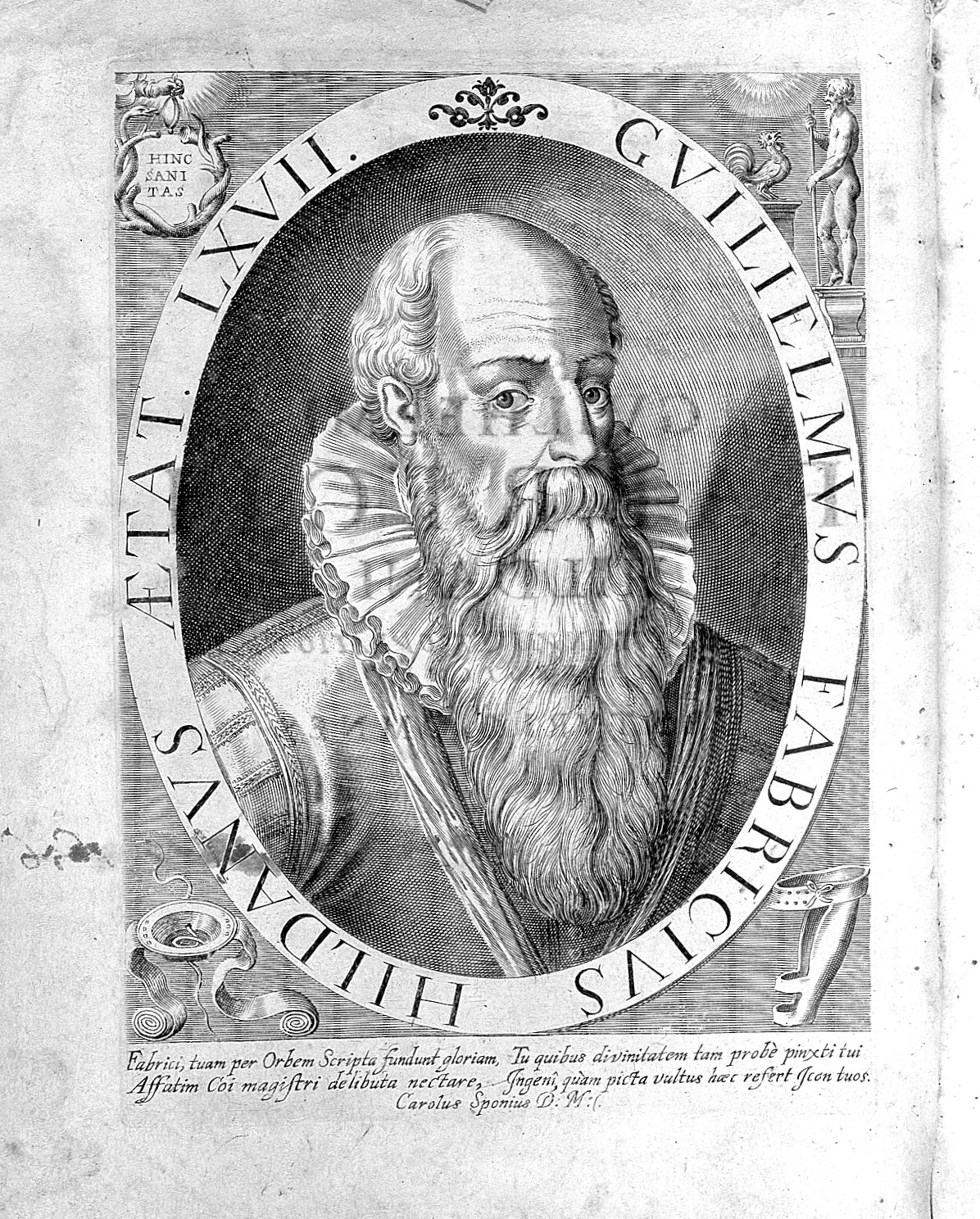
Guilelmus Fabricus Hildanus, Observationum et Curationum Chirurgicarum Centuriae, 1641.

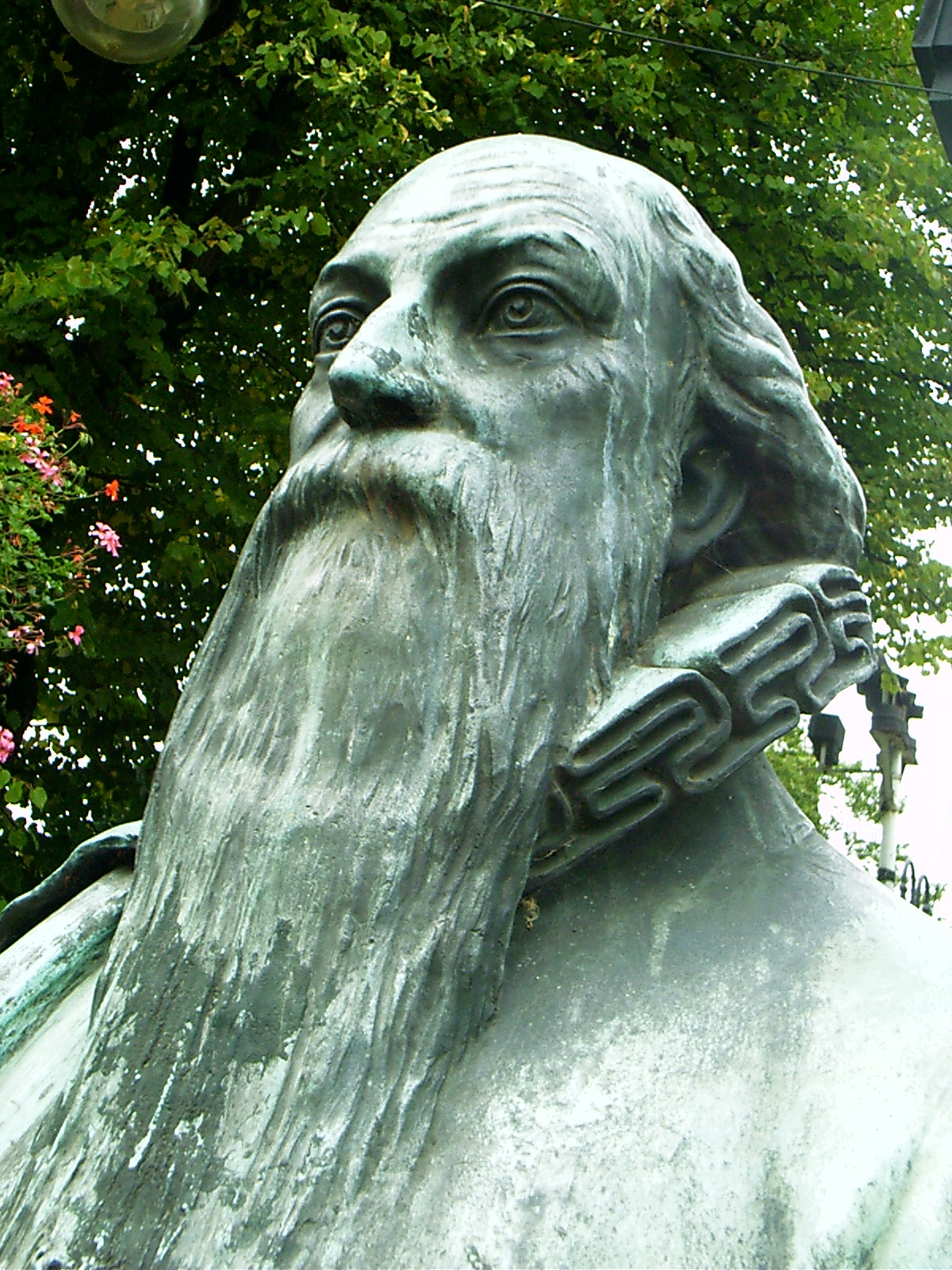
Fabry's bronze bust in Hilden (marketplace)

Wilhelm Fabry (also William Fabry, Guilelmus Fabricius Hildanus, or Fabricius von Hilden) (25 June 1560 − 15 February 1634), often called the "Father of German surgery", was the first educated and scientific German surgeon. He is one of the most prominent scholars in the iatromechanics school and author of 20 medical books. His Observationum et Curationum Chirurgicarum Centuriae, published posthumously in 1641, is the best collection of case records of the century and gives clear insight into the variety and methods of his surgical practice. He developed novel surgical techniques and new surgical instruments. He also wrote a notable treatise on burns.

Fabry was born in Hilden. In 1579, he became Badergeselle ('surgeon's mate') in Düsseldorf of the extraordinary court surgeon Cosmas Slot.

He developed a device for operating eye tumours. On 25 July 1587, he married Marie Colinet (or Fabry), daughter of Eustache Colinet, a Genevese printer. She was a Swiss midwife–surgeon who improved the techniques of cesarean section delivery. She helped her husband in his surgical practice and was the first (in 1624) to use a magnet to extract metal from a patient's eye (a technique still in use today). Fabry wrote a detailed description of the procedure in his Centuriae and, although he explicitly mentioned his wife as having invented it, was given credit for the discovery.

From 1602 to 1615, Fabry was a city surgeon in Payerne, Switzerland, and Lausanne. He was then made city surgeon (Stadtarzt) of Bern by appointment of the city council, a role he held until the year of his death.

The city of Bern, where he died, named a street after him (Hildanusstrasse), using one of the Latin versions of his name.

His birth town named the city museum (featuring surgical instruments and the like) after him, honoured him with a bronze bust in the market place, and named streets after himself and after his wife.

== Works ==
- De Dysenteria : Liber unus: In quo hujus Morbi Causae, Signa, Prognostica, & Praeservatio continentur: Item, quomodo Symptomata, quae huic Morbo supervenire solent, sint removenda. de Bry / Galler, Oppenheimii 1616 Digital edition by the University and State Library Düsseldorf

== Resources ==
- Georg Becker, Wilhelm Fabry von Hilden (Niederbergische Beiträge vol. 6, ed. Heinrich Strangmeier), Wuppertal 1957 (German)
- JONES E (1960). "The Life and Works of Guilhelmus Fabricius Hildanus (1560–1634): Part I". Med Hist. 4 (2): 112–34 contd. doi:10.1017/s0025727300025217. PMC 1034546. PMID 14407687.
- JONES EW (1960). "The Life and Works of Guilhelmus Fabricius Hildanus (1560–1634): Part Ii". Med Hist. 4 (3): 196–209. doi:10.1017/s0025727300025321. PMC 1034897. PMID 14407702.
