= John Arderne =

English surgeon

- Born: 1307
- Died: 1392 (aged 84–85)
- Education: University of Montpellier
- Occupation: Surgeon
- Employer(s): John of Gaunt and the English Army
- Known for: Fistula in ano, making an anesthetic out of hemlock, henbane, and opium.
- Title: Sir

John of Arderne (1307–1392) was an English surgeon, and one of the first of his time to devise some workable cures. He is considered one of the fathers of surgery, described by some as England's first surgeon and by others as the country's first "of note". Many of his treatments are still in use today. Arderne's help was given to both the rich and the poor. His view on fees was that rich men should be charged as much as possible, but poor men should be remedied free of charge. His remedies for illness are considered substantial for his time. Arderne recommended opium as a soporific and as an external anesthetic that the patient "shal sleep so that he shal feel no cutting". In his document about Fistula in ano, John of Arderne sets out not only his operative procedures but also his code of conduct for the ideal medical practitioner.

In his early life, he resided in Newark-on-Trent. It is also believed he could have lived in Nottingham. It is thought that he attended the University of Montpellier, where he was a scholar of the ancients. He was in London by 1370 when he is thought to have been admitted as a member of the Guild of Surgeons. He saw active military service in the Hundred Years' War in the army of Henry of Grosmont, Duke of Lancaster, and John of Gaunt. He fought also at the Siege of Algeciras (1342-1344), one of the first European battles in which gunpowder was used; the injuries he saw there informed his medical writings for three decades. He referred to himself as a Master Surgeon in his works.

He developed several treatments for knights, most notably for an infliction called "Fistula In Ano", a condition where a large, painful lump appears between the base of the spine and the anus, caused by long amounts of time sitting on a horse. He could successfully cut this lump out, and described how to do so in a historical document which still remains. In technical terms, the Fistula in Ano, without any regard to the strict definition of the word, is understood to be an abscess, running upon, or into the Intestinum Rectum; though an abscess in this part, when once ruptured, does generally, if neglected, grow callous in its cavity and edges, and become at last what is properly called a fistula. (This condition is now diagnosed as a sacrococcygeal fistula, more commonly known as a pilonidal cyst.) He also created an ointment for arrow wounds and clysters made out of hemlock, opium and henbane in 1376.

In 1392, Arderne died at the age of 85. He did not have an heir in his will.

== See also ==
- Surgery
- Abdominal surgery
- Hemlock
- Opium
- Anaesthetics
