= Theodoric Borgognoni =

Italian surgeon

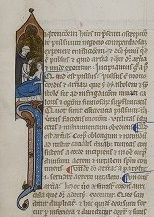
Dominican doctor taking a pulse. Rare Book & Manuscript Library University of Pennsylvania LJS 24

Theodoric Borgognoni (1205 – 1296/8), also known as Teodorico de' Borgognoni, and Theodoric of Lucca, was an Italian who became one of the most significant surgeons of the medieval period. A Dominican friar and Bishop of Cervia, Borgognoni is considered responsible for introducing and promoting important medical advances including basic antiseptic practice in surgery and the use of anaesthetics.

== Life ==
Theodoric Borgognoni was born in Lucca, Italy in 1205. He may well have been the son of Master Hugh Borgognoni, a leading physician of the previous generation, and was certainly a student of his. Theodoric studied medicine at the University of Bologna becoming a Dominican friar in the same period. In the 1240s, he became personal physician to Pope Innocent IV. In 1262 he was made Bishop of Bitonto. He then served as Bishop of Cervia, close to Ravenna, from 1266 until his death in 1296.

== Achievements ==
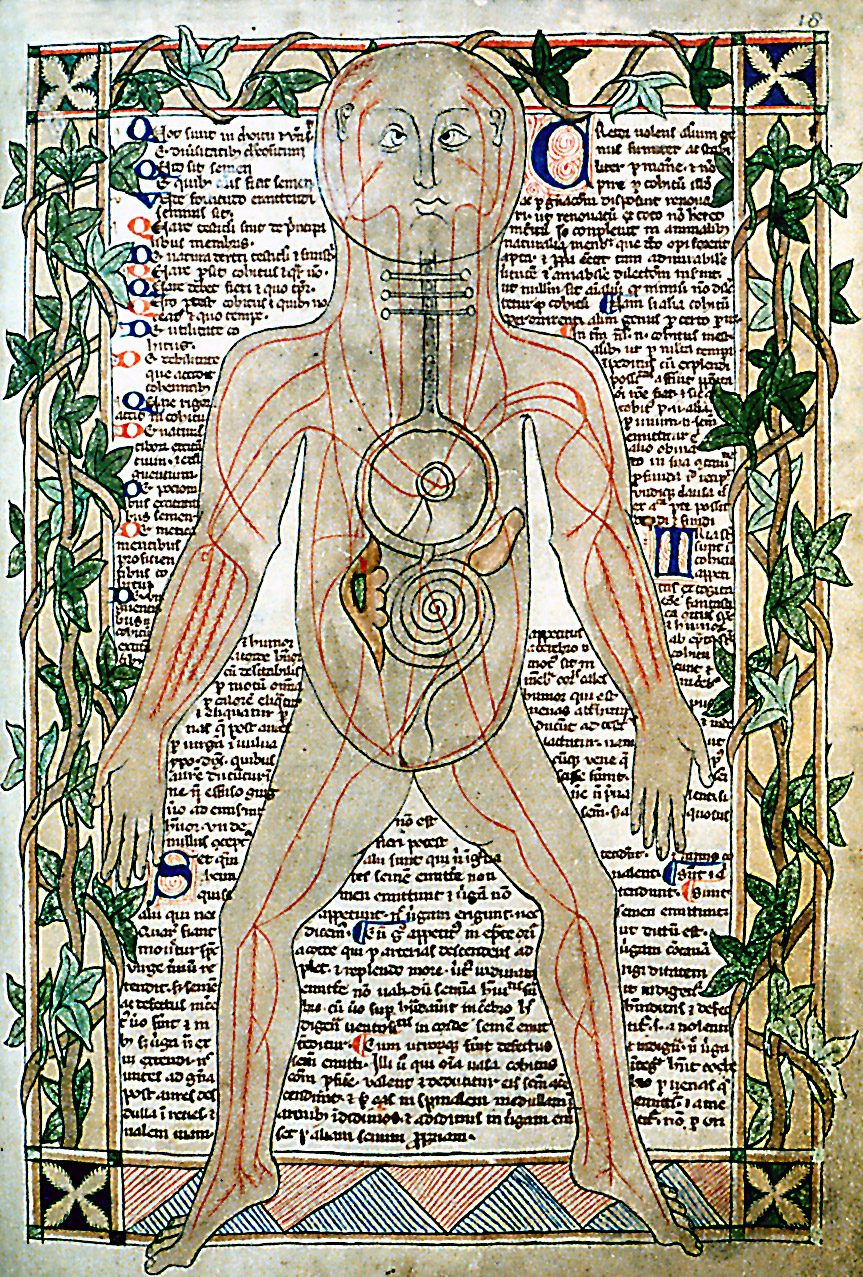
13th century anatomical illustration showing blood vessels.

Borgognoni practiced surgery in addition to his episcopal and religious duties. Despite this, he became the favoured practitioner of many leading personages, including the pope. His major medical work is the Cyrurgia, a systematic four volume treatise covering all aspects of surgery. The book broke with many traditional surgical practices handed down from the ancient Greeks and the Arabic surgeons. Borgognoni was significant in stressing the importance of personal experience and observation as opposed to a blind reliance upon the ancient sources. He insisted that the practice of encouraging the development of pus in wounds, handed down from Galen and from Arabic medicine be replaced by a more antiseptic approach, with the wound being cleaned and then sutured to promote healing. Bandages were to be pre-soaked in wine as a form of disinfectant. He also promoted the use of anesthetics in surgery. A sponge soaked in a dissolved solution of opium, mandrake, hemlock, mulberry juice, ivy and other substances was held beneath the patients nose to induce unconsciousness. In addition to his surgical works, Borgognoni also produced volumes on veterinary medicine and falconry.

== The Cyrurgia ==
The Cyrurgia, or Chirurgia, (Surgery), is Borgognoni's major contribution to western medicine. Written in the mid 13th Century, it is a four volume work that covers the major fields of medieval surgery. On the treatment of wounds he wrote: "For it is not necessary that bloody matter (pus) be generated in wounds -- for there can be no error greater than this, and nothing else which impedes nature so much, and prolongs the sickness." This went against a longstanding weight of medical thinking. Although often disagreeing with Galen, Borgognoni followed him in promoting the dry method for treating wounds, although advocating the use of wine. He wrote on the treatment of thoracic and intestinal injuries, insisting on the importance of avoiding pollution from the contents of the gut. The final volume deals with injuries to the head and some cancers. Borgognoni's test for the diagnosis of shoulder dislocation, namely the ability to touch the opposite ear or shoulder with the hand of the affected arm, has remained in use into modern times.

It has been claimed that parts of Borgognoni's work duplicate chapters of the Chirurgia of Bruno da Longoburgo, written around fifteen years previously, and there is little doubt that some passages have the same source, and both were students of Ugo Borgognoni. However Theodoric's work contains much that is not duplicated in the book of Longoburgo, or which directly contradicts him, and these are often the most important and innovative passages.

== See also ==
- Medieval science
- Medieval medicine of Western Europe
- History of medicine
- Anaesthesia
- List of Roman Catholic scientist-clerics
