= Roland of Parma =

Early 13th-century surgeon

Hippocrates depicted practising various medical techniques from a copy of the Rolandina.

Roland of Parma, (Note: Italian: Rolando da Parma, sometimes Rolandino; Latin: Rolandus Parmensis) also called Rolando Capelluti, (Note: Also spelled Capelluto or Capezzuti.) was an early 13th-century surgeon. He studied under Roger Frugardi in Parma and wrote a commentary on his teacher's Practica chirurgiae (Practice of Surgery) around 1230. His commentary, known as the Rolandina, became the standard surgical textbook in the West for the next three centuries. He later taught in Bologna.

== Bibliography ==
- Bjork, Robert E., ed. (2010). "Roland of Parma". The Oxford Dictionary of the Middle Ages. Oxford University Press.
- Di Trocchio, Federico (1975). "Capelluti, Rolando". Dizionario Biografico degli Italiani (in Italian). Vol. 18: Canella–Cappello. Rome: Istituto dell'Enciclopedia Italiana. ISBN 978-88-12-00032-6.
- Lauer, Josh (2007). "Roland of Parma". In Neil Schlager; Josh Lauer (eds.). Science and Its Times: Understanding the Social Significance of Scientific Discovery, Volume 2 (700–1449). Gale Group. p. 185.
