= List of barbers =

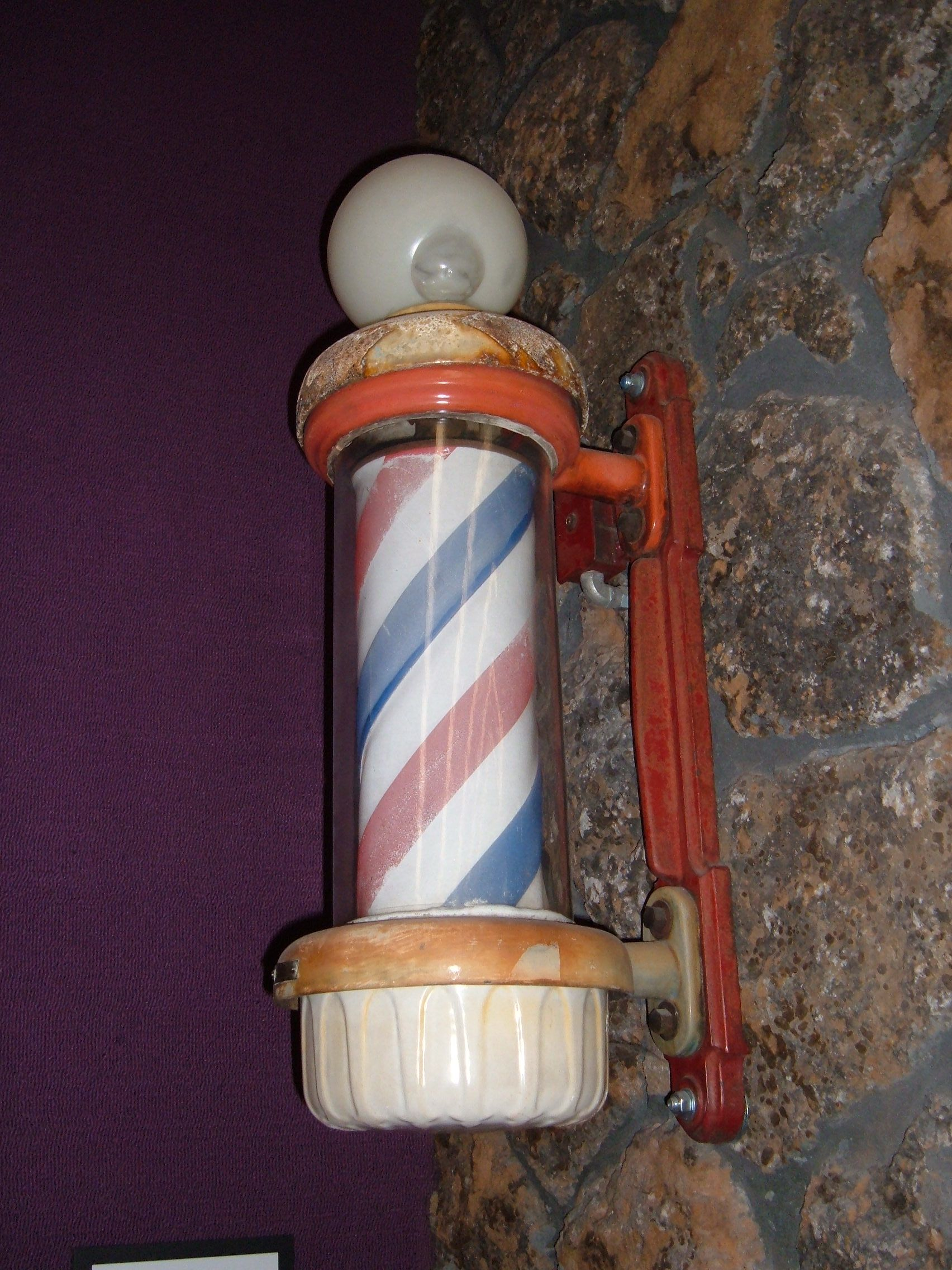
Barbers advertised their profession with a pole, a tradition dating back to the Middle Ages. This pole belonged to Carl Schultz, father of the famous cartoonist.

This is a list of barbers and barber surgeons.

== Barber surgeons ==
The barber surgeon was one of the most common European medical practitioners of the Middle Ages. In this era, surgery was seldom conducted by physicians. Instead, barbers, who possessed razors and dexterity, were responsible for tasks ranging from cutting hair to pulling teeth to amputating limbs.

- Martín de Porres — a 16th- to 17th-century Peruvian lay brother of the Dominican Order, barber surgeon, and saint. He is the patron saint of barbers.
- Ambroise Paré — a pioneering surgeon of 16th-century France when barbers also performed surgery.
- Johanna Hedén — a midwife who became the first female barber surgeon in Sweden
- Magdalena Bendzisławska — a 17th-century barber-surgeon in Poland and the first woman surgeon there.
- Peter Proby — the 16th-century barber of Sir Francis Walsingham who became Master of the Worshipful Company of Barbers and Lord Mayor of London
- Hernando de Bustamante — a 16th-century Spanish sailor and barber surgeon who is best known as one of the few survivors of the first circumnavigation of the globe. He sailed on the Magellan expedition from 1519 to 1522.
- Antoni de Gimbernat — an 18th-century Spanish surgeon and anatomist. He is known for laying the groundwork for modern techniques of inguinal hernia repair.
- Antonio Fernando de Medrano — a 17th-century Basque barber-surgeon and a pioneer of medical professionalism in Spain.
- Magdalena Bendzisławska — a 17th-century Polish barber surgeon for miners of the Wieliczka Salt Mine and their families.
- Elinor Sneshell — a 16th-century English barber-surgeon, active during the reign of Elizabeth I of England.
- The Barber surgeon of Avebury — a skeleton discovered in 1938 at Avebury henge monument in Wiltshire, England.
- Diego Álvarez Chanca — a 15th-century Spanish barber surgeon who accompanied Christopher Columbus on his second voyage.
- David Samwell — an 18th-century Welsh barber surgeon and poet. He was an important supporter of Welsh cultural organisations and was known by the pseudonym Dafydd Ddu Feddyg.

== Barber ==
A barber is a person whose occupation is mainly to cut, dress, groom, style and shave hair or beards.

- Park Bo-gum — South Korean actor who earned a barber's license during his mandatory military service; star of the reality show The Village Barber
- Hugo E. Vogel — Wisconsin assemblyman and barber for more than fifty years
- Johnny Niggeling — a baseball player who barbered when not playing ball
- Joseph Rainey — barber who became the first black US congressman
- Manuel Lopes — the first black resident of Seattle who set up in business with the first barber's chair to be brought round Cape Horn
- Richard Milburn — known as Whistling Dick, he composed the famous tune "Listen to the Mocking Bird"
- William Johnson — the barber of Natchez who kept an extensive diary
- William L. Smith — Milwaukee barber who served as a Wisconsin assemblyman

== Fictional barbers ==
- Sweeney Todd
- The Barber of Seville

== See also ==
- Feldsher
- Worshipful Company of Barbers
- Barber Surgeons role in Expedition Medicine
