= Bloodletting =

Therapy, now rarely used in medicine

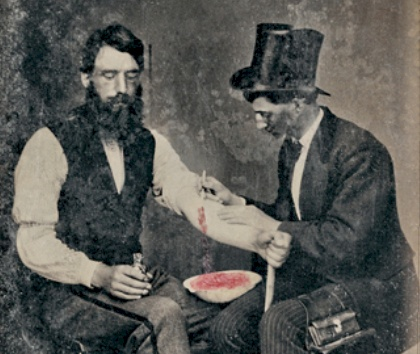
- Bloodletting in 1860
- MeSH: D001815

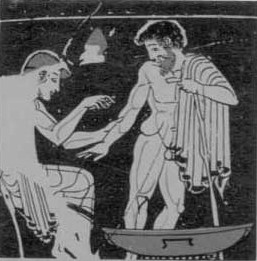
Ancient Greek painting on a vase, showing a physician (iatros) bleeding a patient

Bloodletting (or blood-letting) is the deliberate withdrawal of blood from a patient to prevent or cure illness and disease. Bloodletting, whether by a physician or by leeches, was based on an ancient system of medicine in which blood and other bodily fluids were regarded as "humors" that had to remain in proper balance to maintain health. It was the most common medical practice performed by surgeons from antiquity until the late 19th century, a span of over 2,000 years. In Europe, the practice continued to be relatively common until the end of the 19th century. The practice has been abandoned by modern-style medicine for all except a few very specific medical conditions. In the beginning of the 19th century, studies had begun to show the harmful effects of bloodletting.

The modern term phlebotomy refers to the drawing of blood for laboratory analysis or blood transfusion. Therapeutic phlebotomy refers to the drawing of a unit of blood in specific cases like hemochromatosis, polycythemia vera, porphyria cutanea tarda, etc., to reduce the number of red blood cells. The traditional medical practice of bloodletting is considered a pseudoscience, though the method is still commonly used in forms of alternative medicine.

== In the ancient world ==
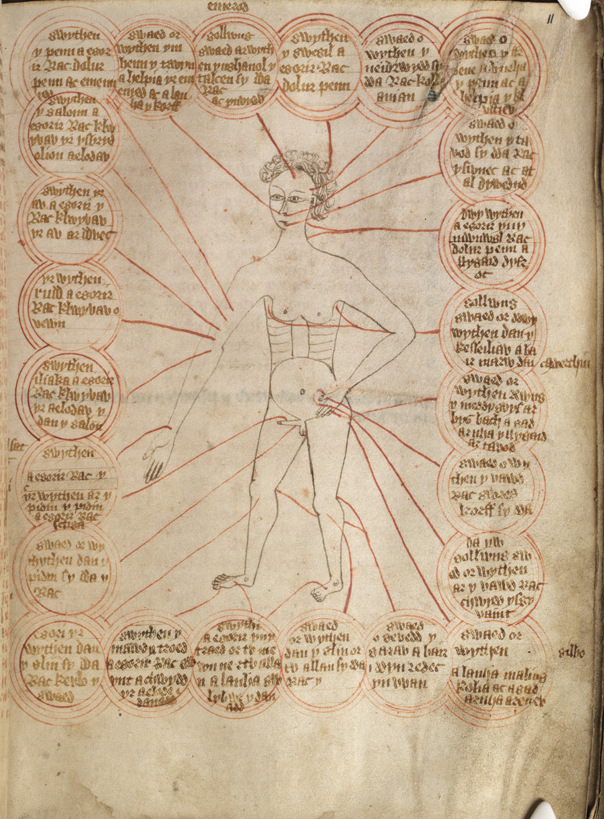
A chart showing the parts of the body to be bled for different diseases, c. 1310–1320

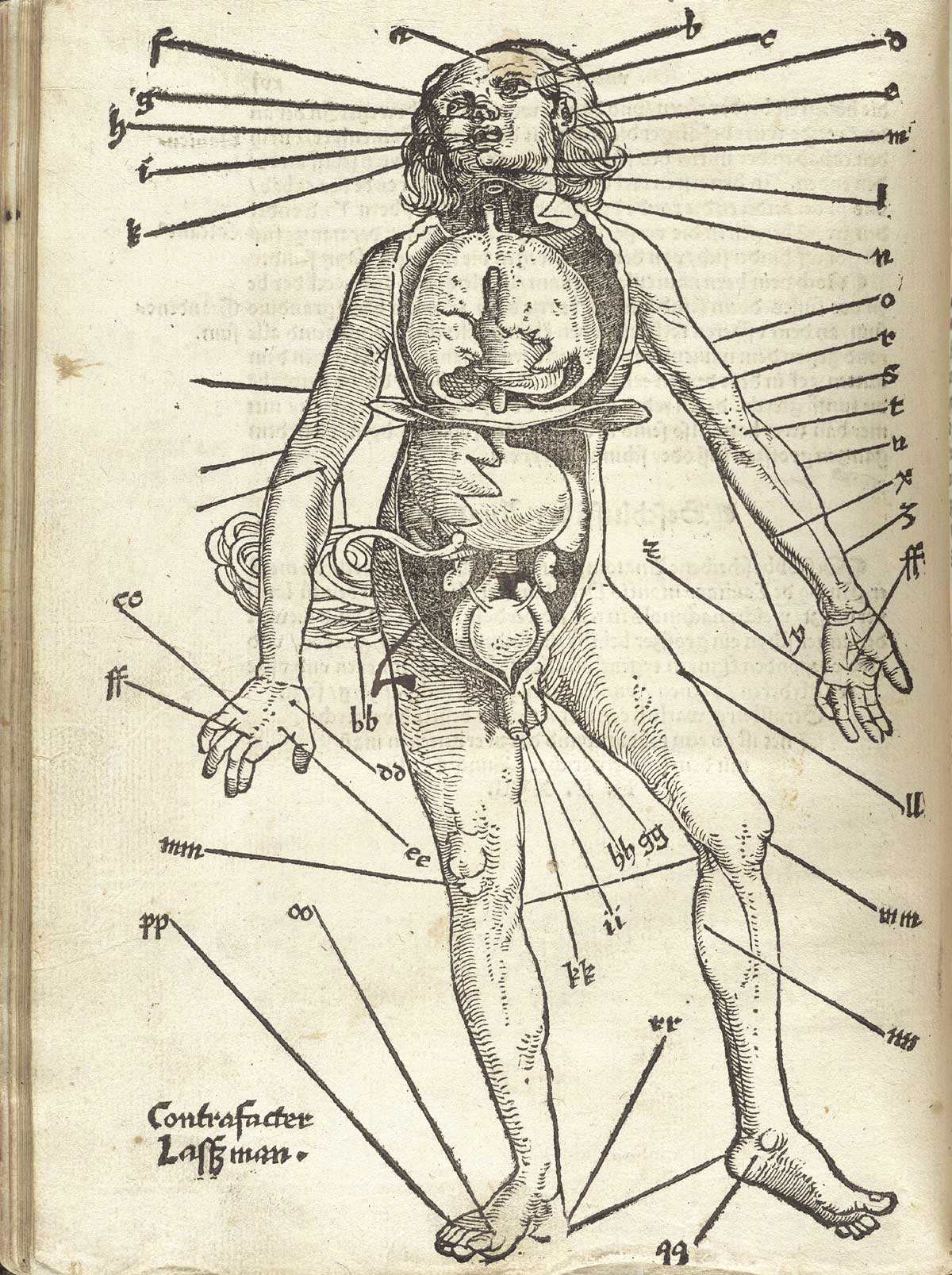
Points for bloodletting, Hans von Gersdorff, Field book of wound medicine, 1517

Passages from the Ebers Papyrus may indicate that bloodletting by scarification was an accepted practice in Ancient Egypt. Egyptian burials have been reported to contain bloodletting instruments. According to some accounts, the Egyptians based the idea on their observations of the hippopotamus, confusing its red secretions with blood and believing that it scratched itself to relieve distress.

In Greece, bloodletting was in use in the 5th century BC during the lifetime of Hippocrates, who mentions this practice but generally relied on dietary techniques. Erasistratus, however, theorized that many diseases were caused by plethoras, or overabundances, in the blood and advised that these plethoras be treated, initially, by exercise, sweating, reduced food intake, and vomiting. But his student Herophilus supported bloodletting. A contemporary Greek physician, Archagathus, one of the first to practice in Rome, also believed in the value of bloodletting.

"Bleeding" a patient to health was modeled on the process of menstruation. Hippocrates believed that menstruation functioned to "purge women of bad humors". During the Roman Empire, the Greek physician Galen, who subscribed to the teachings of Hippocrates, advocated physician-initiated bloodletting.

The popularity of bloodletting in the classical Mediterranean world was reinforced by the ideas of Galen, after he discovered that not only veins but also arteries were filled with blood, not air as was commonly believed at the time. There were two key concepts in his system of bloodletting. The first was that blood was created and then used up; it did not circulate, and so it could "stagnate" in the extremities. The second was that humoral balance was the basis of illness or health, the four humors being blood, phlegm, black bile, and yellow bile, relating to the four Greek classical elements of air, water, earth, and fire respectively. Galen believed that blood was the dominant humor and the one in most need of control. In order to balance the humors, a physician would either remove "excess" blood (plethora) from the patient or give them an emetic to induce vomiting, or a diuretic to induce urination.

Galen created a complex system of how much blood should be removed based on the patient's age, constitution, the season, the weather and the place. "Do-it-yourself" bleeding instructions following these systems were developed. Symptoms of plethora were believed to include fever, apoplexy, and headache. The blood to be let was of a specific nature determined by the disease: either arterial or venous, and distant or close to the area of the body affected. He linked different blood vessels with different organs, according to their supposed drainage. For example, the vein in the right hand would be let for liver problems and the vein in the left hand for problems with the spleen. The more severe the disease, the more blood would be let. Fevers required copious amounts of bloodletting.

== Middle Ages ==
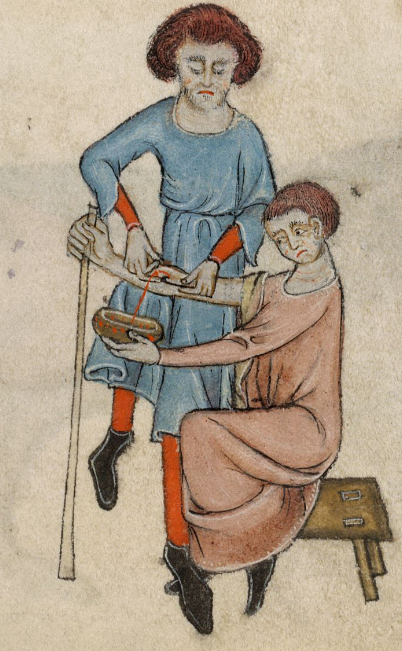
1335-1340, England. Physician or barber bleeding a patient

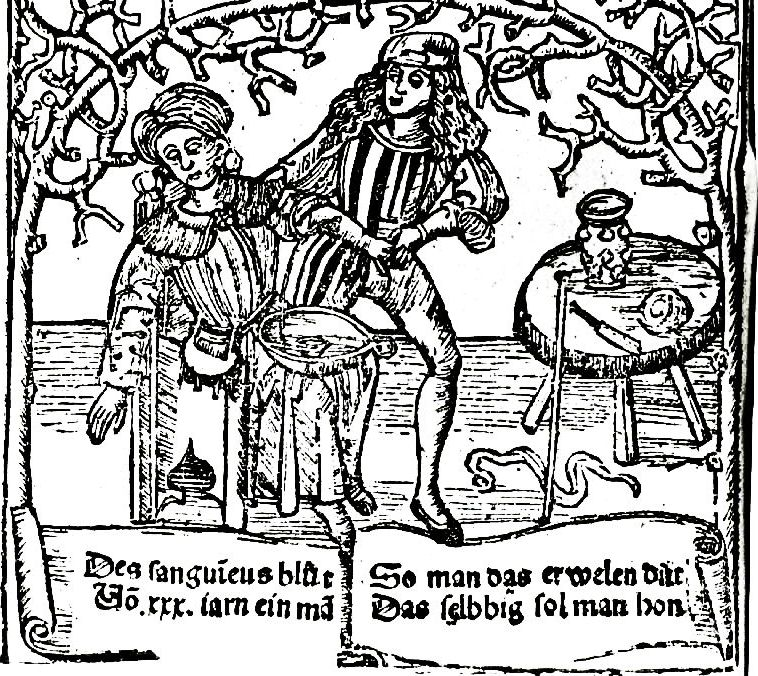
Circa 1300 A.D., Germany. A physician holds the patient's arm straight, while blood streams into a bowl. The knife used to cut the wound is on the table, a tourniquet on the floor. The caption refers to sanguineus blood.

The Talmud recommended a specific day of the week and days of the month for bloodletting in the Shabbat tractate. During medieval times bleeding charts were common, showing specific bleeding sites on the body in alignment with the planets and zodiacs. Islamic medical authors also advised bloodletting, particularly for fevers. It was practised according to seasons and certain phases of the Moon in the lunar calendar. The practice was probably passed by the Greeks with the translation of ancient texts to Arabic and is different from bloodletting by cupping mentioned in the traditions of Muhammad. When Muslim theories became known in the Latin-speaking countries of Europe, bloodletting became more widespread. Together with cautery, it was central to Arabic surgery; the key texts Kitab al-Qanun and especially Al-Tasrif li-man 'ajaza 'an al-ta'lif both recommended it. It was also known in Ayurvedic medicine, described in the Susruta Samhita.

In the 16th century, printed surgical manuals helped to standardize bloodletting for battlefield surgeons. Hans von Gersforff's 1517 book, Feldtbuch der Wendtartzney, included woodcut illustrations showing "wound men" marked with specific venesection points. These visual diagrams were helpful to surgeons in helping them to learn phlebotomy techniques without relying heavily on guild apprenticeship.

== Use in the 1600s through the 19th century ==
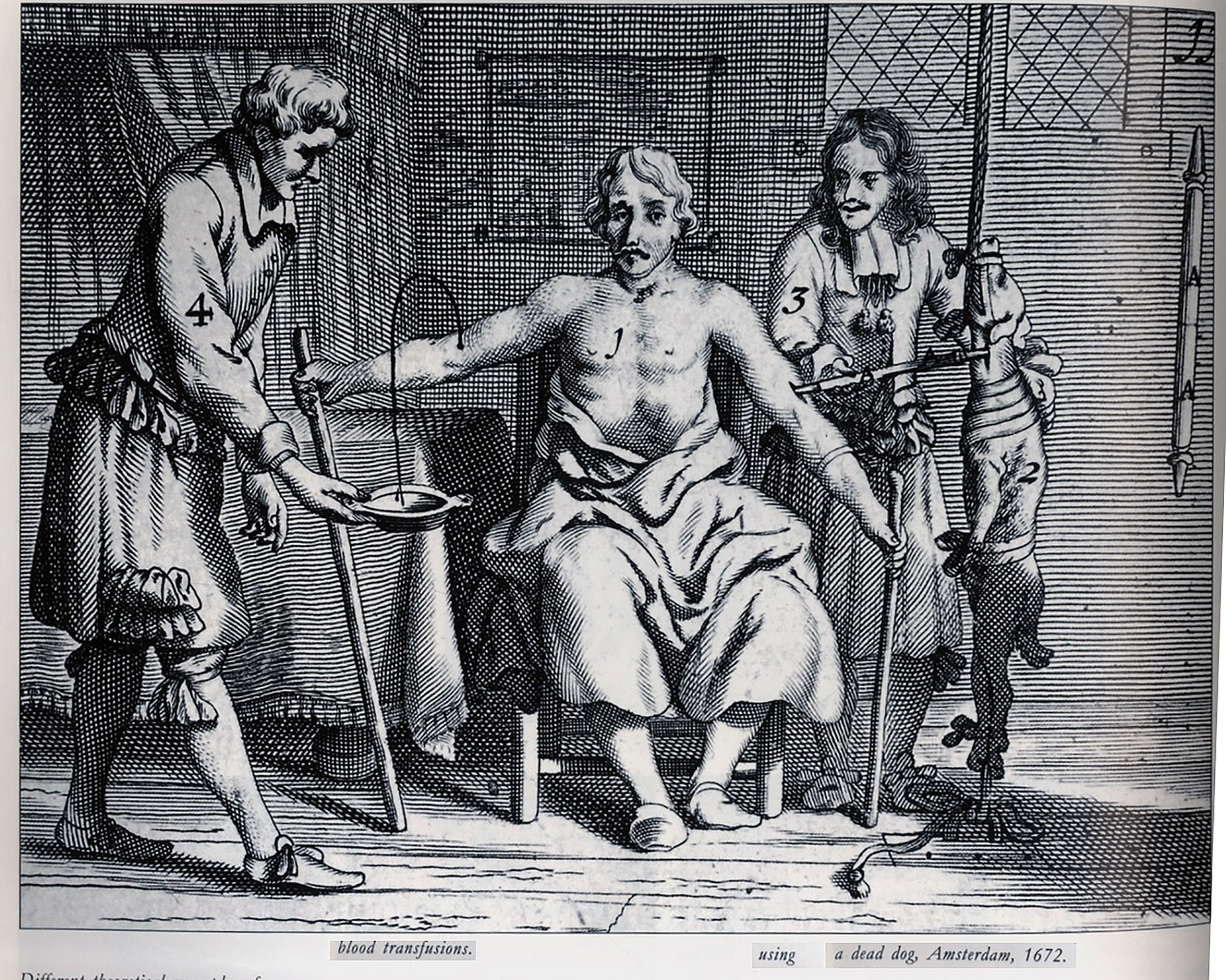
Johannes Scultetus Armamentarium Chirurgicum, 1693 – diagrammed transfusion of dog's blood

Bloodletting became a main technique of heroic medicine, a traumatic and destructive collection of medical practices that emerged in the 18th century.

Even after the humoral system fell into disuse, the practice was continued by surgeons and barber-surgeons. Though the bloodletting was often recommended by physicians, it was carried out by barbers. This led to the distinction between physicians and surgeons. The red-and-white-striped pole of the barbershop, still in use today, is derived from this practice: the red symbolizes blood while the white symbolizes the bandages. Bloodletting was used to "treat" a wide range of diseases, becoming a standard treatment for almost every ailment, and was practiced prophylactically as well as therapeutically.

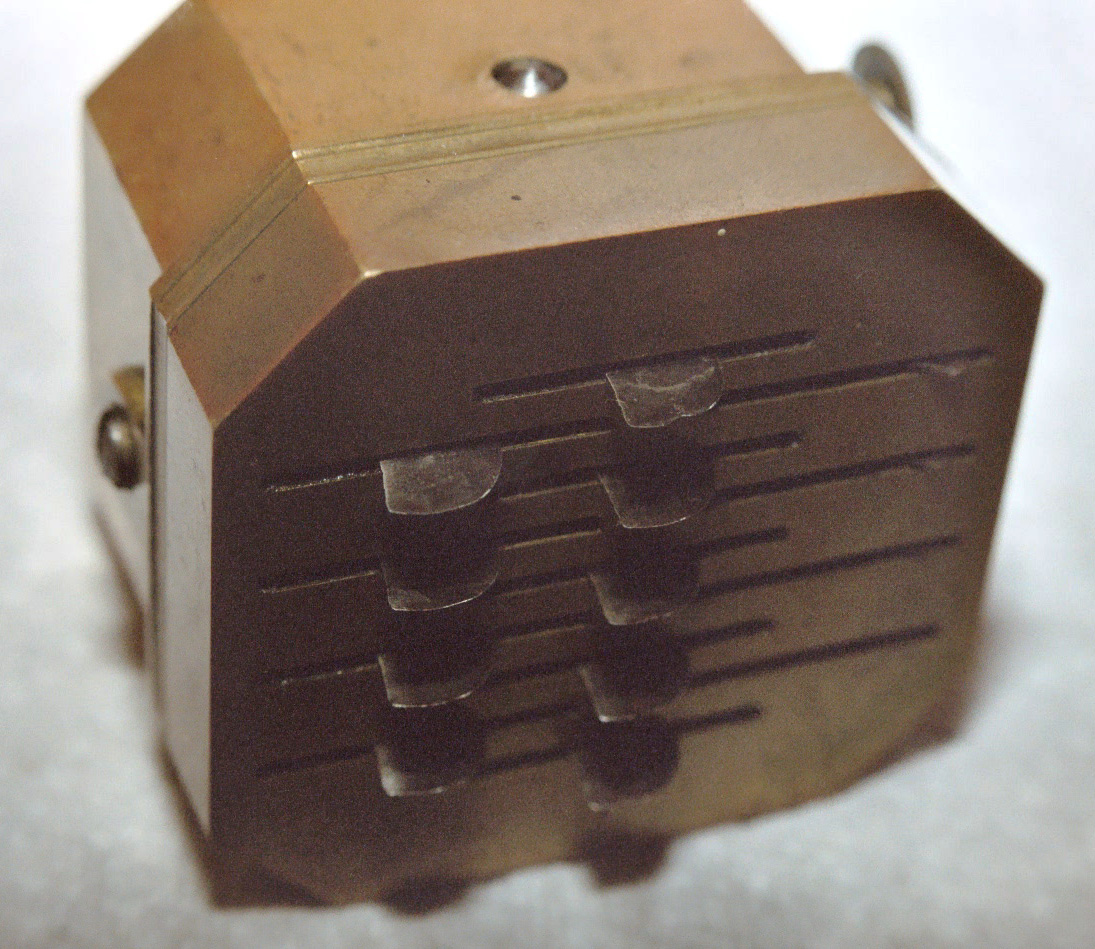
Scarificator

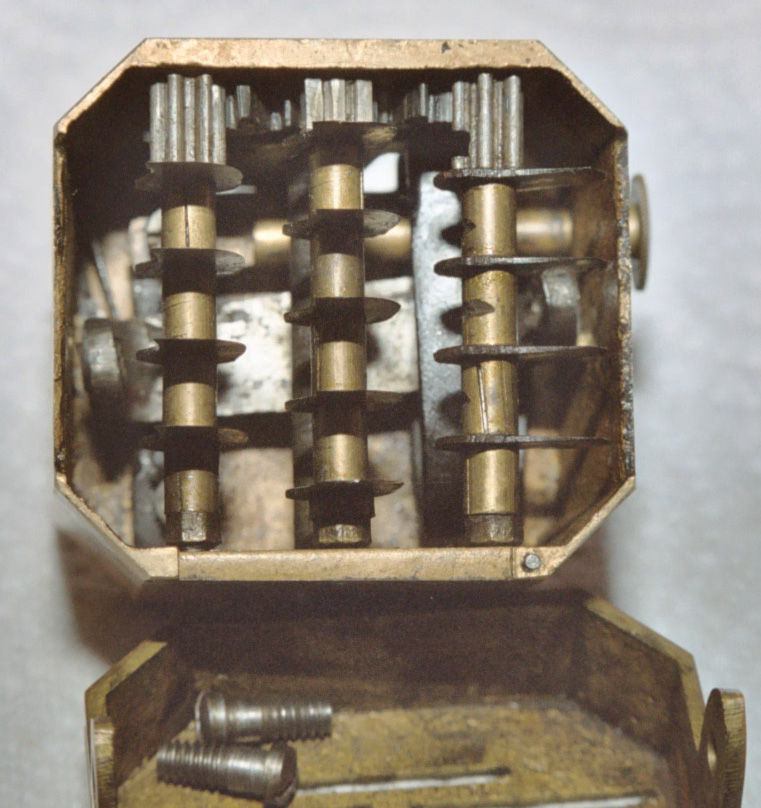
Scarificator mechanism

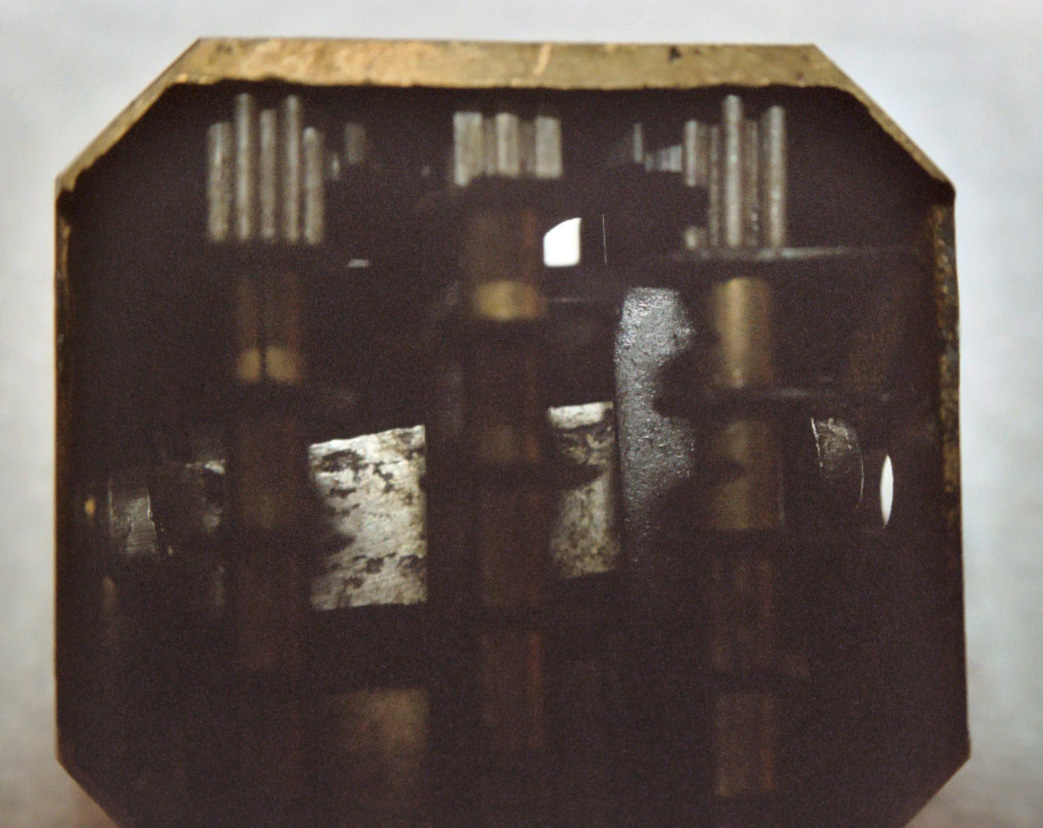
Scarificator, showing depth adjustment bar

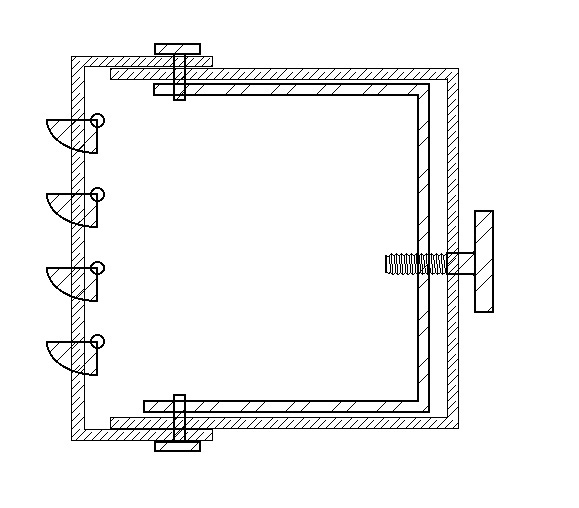
Diagram of scarificator, showing depth adjustment

A number of different methods were employed. The most common was phlebotomy, or venesection (often called "breathing a vein"), in which blood was drawn from one or more of the larger external veins, such as those in the forearm or neck. In arteriotomy, an artery was punctured, although generally only in the temples. In scarification (not to be confused with scarification, a method of body modification), the "superficial" vessels were attacked, often using a syringe, a spring-loaded lancet, or a glass cup that contained heated air, producing a vacuum within (see fire cupping). There was also a specific bloodletting tool called a scarificator, used primarily in 19th century medicine. It has a spring-loaded mechanism with gears that snaps the blades out through slits in the front cover and back in, in a circular motion. The case is cast brass, and the mechanism and blades steel. One knife bar gear has slipped teeth, turning the blades in a different direction than those on the other bars. The last photo and the diagram show the depth adjustment bar at the back and sides.

Leeches could also be used. The withdrawal of so much blood as to induce syncope (fainting) was considered beneficial, and many sessions would only end when the patient began to swoon.

William Harvey disproved the basis of the practice in 1628, and the introduction of scientific medicine, la méthode numérique, allowed Pierre Charles Alexandre Louis to demonstrate that phlebotomy was entirely ineffective in the treatment of pneumonia and various fevers in the 1830s. Nevertheless, in 1838, a lecturer at the Royal College of Physicians would still state that "blood-letting is a remedy which, when judiciously employed, it is hardly possible to estimate too highly", and Louis was dogged by the sanguinary Broussais, who could recommend leeches fifty at a time. Some physicians resisted Louis' work because they "were not prepared to discard therapies 'validated by both tradition and their own experience on account of somebody else's numbers'."

During this era, bloodletting was used to treat almost every disease. One British medical text recommended bloodletting for acne, asthma, cancer, cholera, coma, convulsions, diabetes, epilepsy, gangrene, gout, herpes, indigestion, insanity, jaundice, leprosy, ophthalmia, plague, pneumonia, scurvy, smallpox, stroke, tetanus, tuberculosis, and for some one hundred other diseases. Bloodletting was even used to treat most forms of hemorrhaging such as nosebleed, excessive menstruation, or hemorrhoidal bleeding. Before surgery or at the onset of childbirth, blood was removed to prevent inflammation. Before amputation, it was customary to remove a quantity of blood equal to the amount believed to circulate in the limb that was to be removed.

There were also theories that bloodletting would cure "heartsickness" and "heartbreak". A French physician, Jacques Ferrand wrote a book in 1623 on the uses of bloodletting to cure a broken heart. He recommended bloodletting to the point of heart failure (literal).

Leeches became especially popular in the early 19th century. In the 1830s, the French imported about 40 million leeches a year for medical purposes, and in the next decade, England imported 6 million leeches a year from France alone. Through the early decades of the century, hundreds of millions of leeches were used by physicians throughout Europe.

One typical course of medical treatment began the morning of 13 July 1824. A French sergeant was stabbed through the chest while engaged in single combat; within minutes, he fainted from loss of blood. Arriving at the local hospital he was immediately bled twenty ounces (570 ml) "to prevent inflammation". During the night he was bled another 24 ounces (680 ml). Early the next morning, the chief surgeon bled the patient another 10 ounces (285 ml); during the next 14 hours, he was bled five more times. Medical attendants thus intentionally removed more than half of the patient's normal blood supply—in addition to the initial blood loss which caused the sergeant to faint. Bleedings continued over the next several days. By 29 July, the wound had become inflamed. The physician applied 32 leeches to the most sensitive part of the wound. Over the next three days, there were more bleedings and a total of 40 more leeches. The sergeant recovered and was discharged on 3 October. His physician wrote that "by the large quantity of blood lost, amounting to 170 ounces [nearly eleven pints] (4.8 liters), besides that drawn by the application of leeches [perhaps another two pints] (1.1 liters), the life of the patient was preserved". By nineteenth-century standards, thirteen pints of blood taken over the space of a month was a large but not an exceptional quantity. The medical literature of the period contains many similar accounts—some successful, some not.

Bloodletting was also popular in the young United States of America, where Benjamin Rush (a signatory of the Declaration of Independence) saw the state of the arteries as the key to disease, recommending levels of bloodletting that were high even for the time. George Washington asked to be bled heavily after he developed a throat infection from weather exposure. Within a ten-hour period, a total of 124–126 ounces (3.75 liters) of blood was withdrawn prior to his death from a throat infection in 1799.

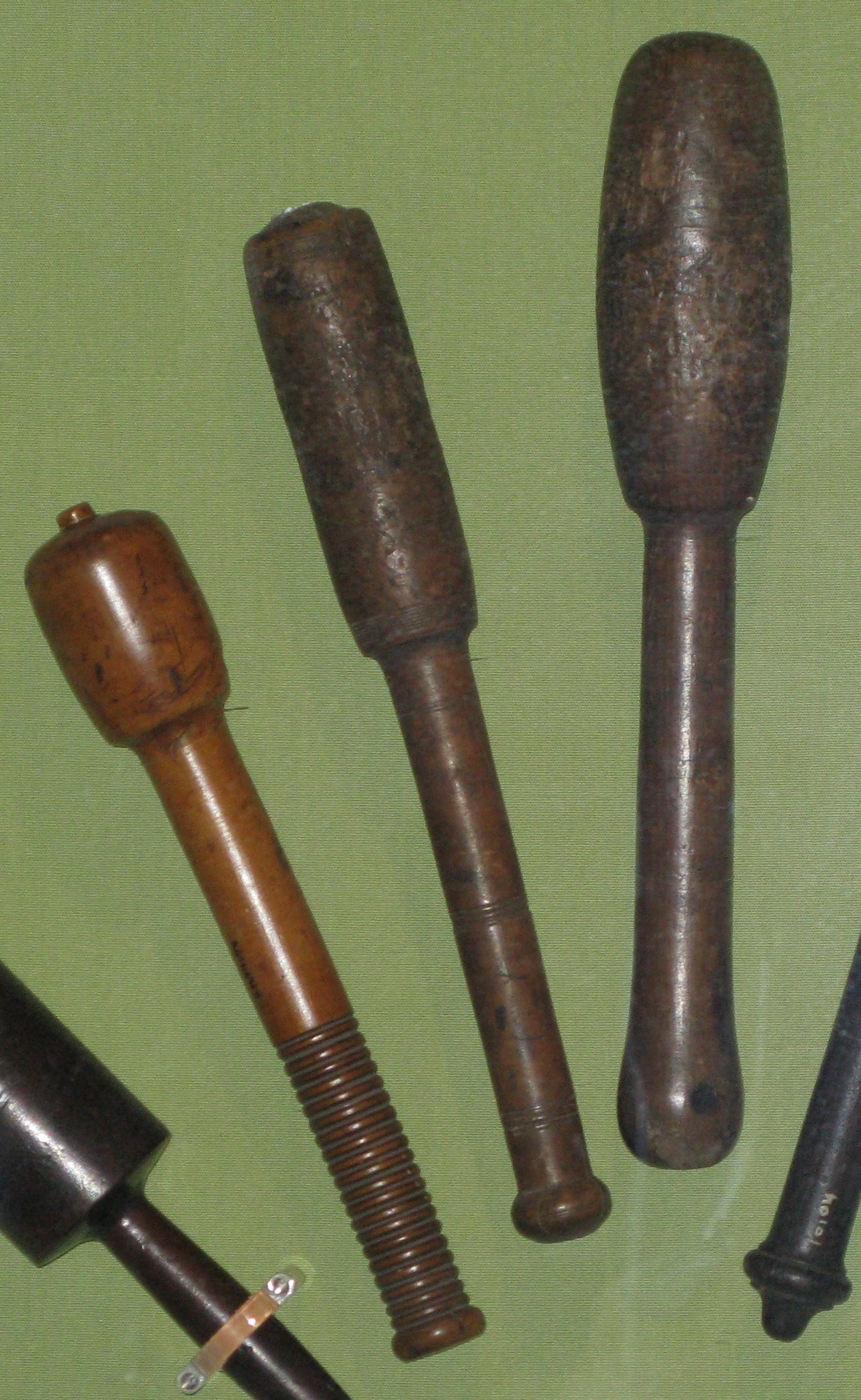
Bloodsticks for use when bleeding animals

One reason for the continued popularity of bloodletting (and purging) was that, while anatomical knowledge, surgical and diagnostic skills increased tremendously in Europe from the 17th century, the key to curing disease remained elusive, and the underlying belief was that it was better to give any treatment than nothing at all. The psychological benefit of bloodletting to the patient (a placebo effect) may sometimes have outweighed the physiological problems it caused. Bloodletting slowly lost favour during the 19th century, after French physician Dr. Pierre Louis conducted an experiment in which he studied the effect of bloodletting on pneumonia patients. A number of other ineffective or harmful treatments were available as placebos—mesmerism, various processes involving the new technology of electricity, many potions, tonics, and elixirs. Yet, bloodletting persisted during the 19th century partly because it was readily available to people of any socioeconomic status.

Barbara Ehrenreich and Deirdre English write that the popularity of bloodletting and heroic medicine in general was because of a need to justify medical billing. Traditional healing techniques had been mostly practiced by women within a non-commercial family or village setting. As male doctors suppressed these techniques, they found it difficult to quantify various "amounts" of healing to charge for, and difficult to convince patients to pay for it. Because bloodletting seemed active and dramatic, it helped convince patients the doctor had something tangible to sell.

== Methods: Practitioners ==
Bloodletting was performed by different types of medical practitioners, which depended on social classes. University-trained physicians could diagnose conditions and prescribed bloodletting according to astrological charts and humoral theory. The physicians rarely ever performed the procedures themselves. The physical cuts were usually made by lower-status practitoners, such as barber-surgeons, local healers, or monks.

Ibn Sina's 11th century 'Canon of Medicine', stated that bloodletting was to be managed from the side of the body opposite to the disease's location. While French anatomist and professor of Surgery, Jacobus Sylvius believed in opposite-side bloodletting to be done on the same side of the disease's location.

== Controversy and use into the 20th century ==
Bloodletting gradually declined in popularity over the course of the 19th century, becoming rather uncommon in most places, before its validity was thoroughly debated. In the medical community of Edinburgh, bloodletting was abandoned in practice before it was challenged in theory, a contradiction highlighted by physician-physiologist John Hughes Bennett. Authorities such as Austin Flint I, Hiram Corson, and William Osler became prominent supporters of bloodletting in the 1880s and onwards, disputing Bennett's premise that bloodletting had fallen into disuse because it did not work. These advocates framed bloodletting as an orthodox medical practice, to be used in spite of its general unpopularity. Some physicians considered bloodletting useful for a more limited range of purposes, such as to "clear out" infected or weakened blood or its ability to "cause hæmorrhages to cease"—as evidenced in a call for a "fair trial for blood-letting as a remedy" in 1871.

Some researchers used statistical methods for evaluating treatment effectiveness to discourage bloodletting. But at the same time, publications by Philip Pye-Smith and others defended bloodletting on scientific grounds.

Bloodletting persisted into the 20th century and was recommended in the 1923 edition of the textbook The Principles and Practice of Medicine. The textbook was originally written by Sir William Osler and continued to be published in new editions under new authors following Osler's death in 1919.

Bloodletting was once thought to reduce inflammation, boost immunity, and improve circulation by aiding in the detoxification of the blood circulating throughout the body. Over time, however, bloodletting's harmful impacts made the practice a less preferable form of medicine. Not only was bloodletting generally ineffective, it also commonly led to significant blood loss. High loss of blood made patients highly susceptible to infection/sepsis or the formation of a hematoma. Additionally, bloodletting also caused anemia, leading the patient to feel weak, tired, or even go unconscious. The harmful effects did not stop there; in severe cases, bloodletting had the potential to cause deadly hypovolemic shock. As the medical world advanced, these deadly effects made the practice of bloodletting fade in popularity.

Leeches are still used to treat some nervous-system abnormalities, dental problems, skin diseases and infections. Leeches may also be used in surgery, as they secrete peptides and proteins that help prevent blood clots.

== Therapeutic phlebotomy ==
Therapeutic phlebotomy is used today in the treatment of a few diseases, including hemochromatosis, sickle cell disease, porphyria cutanea tarda, metabolic dysfunction–associated steatotic liver disease (MASLD), and polycythemia. It is practiced by specifically trained practitioners in hospitals using modern techniques and a relatively safe procedure that depletes iron stores in the body. In most cases, phlebotomy now refers to the removal of small quantities of blood for diagnostic purposes and is an important procedure in the US. According to an academic article posted in the Journal of Infusion Nursing with data published in 2010, the primary use of phlebotomy is to take blood that would be reinfused back into a person (blood donation). However, in the case of hemochromatosis, bloodletting (by venipuncture) has become the mainstay treatment option. Therapeutic phlebotomy is a cost effective way to remove excess iron in blood for patients that have hemochromatosis.

== Cross-cultural bloodletting ==
Therapeutic uses of bloodletting were reported in 60 distinct cultures/ethnic groups in the HRAF database, present in all inhabited continents. Bloodletting has also been reported in 15 of the 60 cultures in the probability sample files (PSF) list. The PSF is a subset of eHRAF data that includes only one culture from each of 60 macro-culture areas around the world. The prevalence of bloodletting in PSF controls for pseudo-replication linked to common ancestry, suggesting that bloodletting has independently emerged many times. Bloodletting is varied in its practices cross-culturally, for example, in native Alaskan culture bloodletting was practiced for different indications, using different tools, on different body areas, by different people, and it was explained by different medical theories.

According to Helena Miton et al.'s analysis of the HRAF database and other sources, there are several cross-cultural patterns in bloodletting.

- Bloodletting is not self-administered. Out of 14 cultures in which the bloodletting practitioner was mentioned, the practitioner was always a third party. 13 out of 14 of the cultures had practitioners with roles related to medicine, while one culture had a practitioner whose role was not related to medicine.
- The idea of bloodletting removing "bad blood" that needs to be taken out was common, and was explicitly mentioned in 10 out of 14 cultures studied with detailed descriptions of bloodletting.
- Bloodletting is not thought to be effective against illness caused supernaturally by humans (e.g., witchcraft). This is surprising, because in most cultures witchcraft and sorcery can be blamed for ailments. But out of 14 cultures with detailed bloodletting descriptions, there was no evidence of bloodletting being used to cure witchcraft-related ailments, while bloodletting was recorded as a cure for ailments of other origins. The Azande culture has been recorded to believe that bloodletting does not work to cure human-related witchcraft ailments.
- Bloodletting is usually administered directly to the affected area, e.g. if the patient has a headache, a cut is made on the forehead. Out of 14 cultures with information on the localization of bloodletting, 11 at least sometimes removed blood from the affected area, while 3 specifically removed blood from a different area from the area in pain. Europe is the only continent with more instances of non-colocalized than colocalized bloodletting.

In a transmission chain experiment done on people living in the US through Amazon Mechanical Turk, stories about bloodletting in a non-affected area were much more likely to transition into stories about bloodletting being administered near the area in pain than vice versa. This suggests that colocalized bloodletting could be a cultural attractor and is more likely to be culturally transmitted, even among people in the US who are likely more familiar with non-colocalized bloodletting.

Bloodletting as a concept is thought to be a cultural attractor, or an intrinsically attractive / culturally transmissible concept. This could explain bloodletting's independent cross-cultural emergence and common cross-cultural traits.

== See also ==
- Blood donation
- Bloodstopping
- Cupping therapy
- Fleams
- Hematology
- History of medicine
- Humorism
- Leech
- Panacea
- Phlebotomy
- Trepanation

== Books cited ==
- Carter, K. Codell; Barbara R. Carter (2005). Childbed fever. A scientific biography of Ignaz Semmelweis. Transaction Publishers. ISBN 978-1-4128-0467-7.
- Carter, K. Codell (2012). The Decline of Therapeutic Bloodletting and the Collapse of Traditional Medicine. New Brunswick & London: Transaction Publishers. ISBN 978-1-4128-4604-2.
- Kang, Lydia; Nate Pederson (2017). Quackery: A Brief History of the Worst Ways to Cure Everything. Workman Publishing Company.
