= Barber surgeon =

Type of surgeon recruited as barbers

Barber Surgeon defunct profession
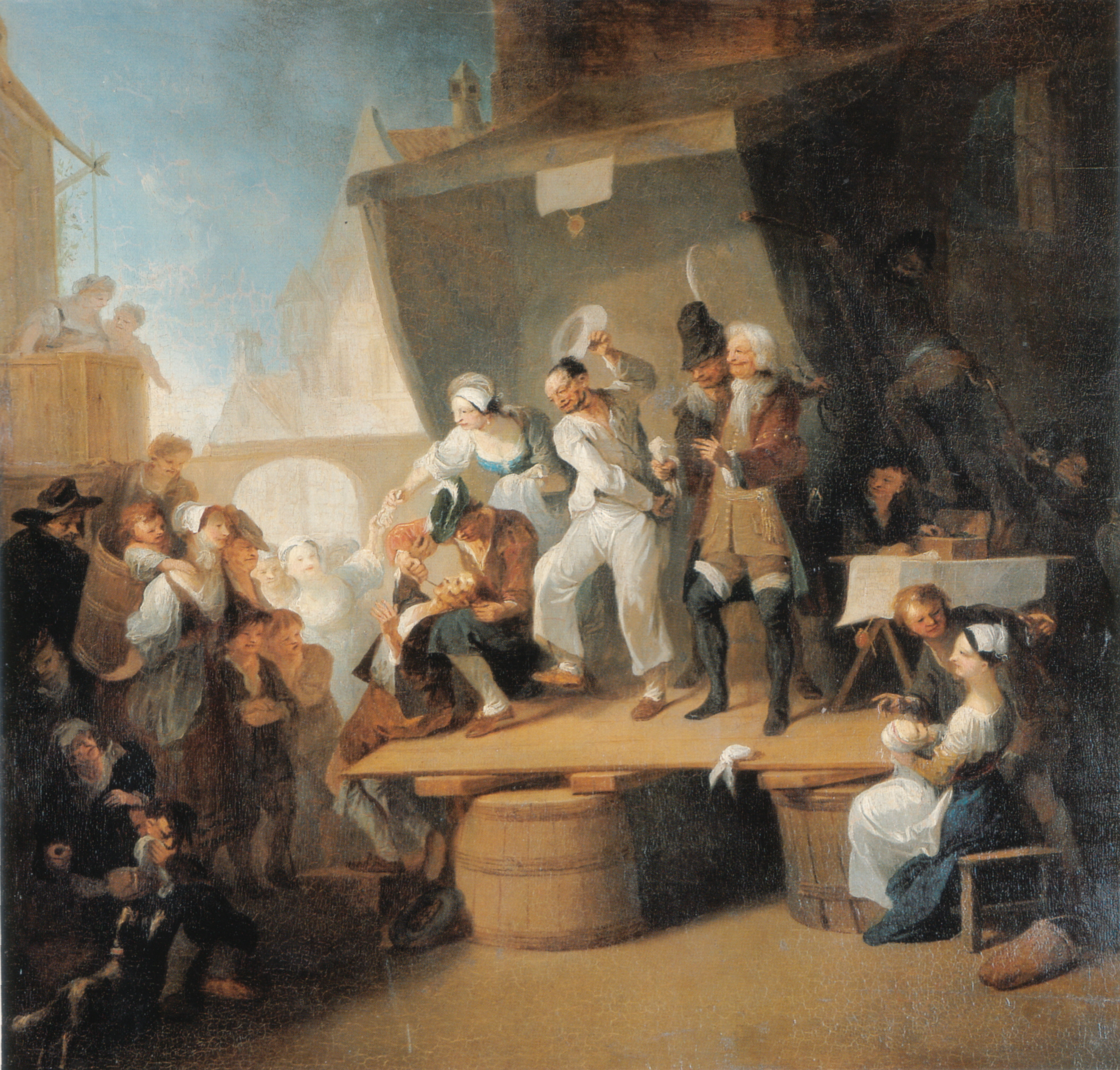
- Franz Anton Maulbertsch's The Quack (c. 1785) shows barber surgeons at work.
- Education: apprenticeship
- Occupations: battlefield medicine, expedition medicine
- Era: 11th through 19th century
- Known for: Surgical procedures, basic medical care, and grooming services: Bloodletting; Tooth extraction; Minor surgery (lancing abscesses, wound treatment); Amputations (major surgery, often for battlefield injuries); Treating fractures and dislocations
- Successor: Modern Surgery and Barbering trade

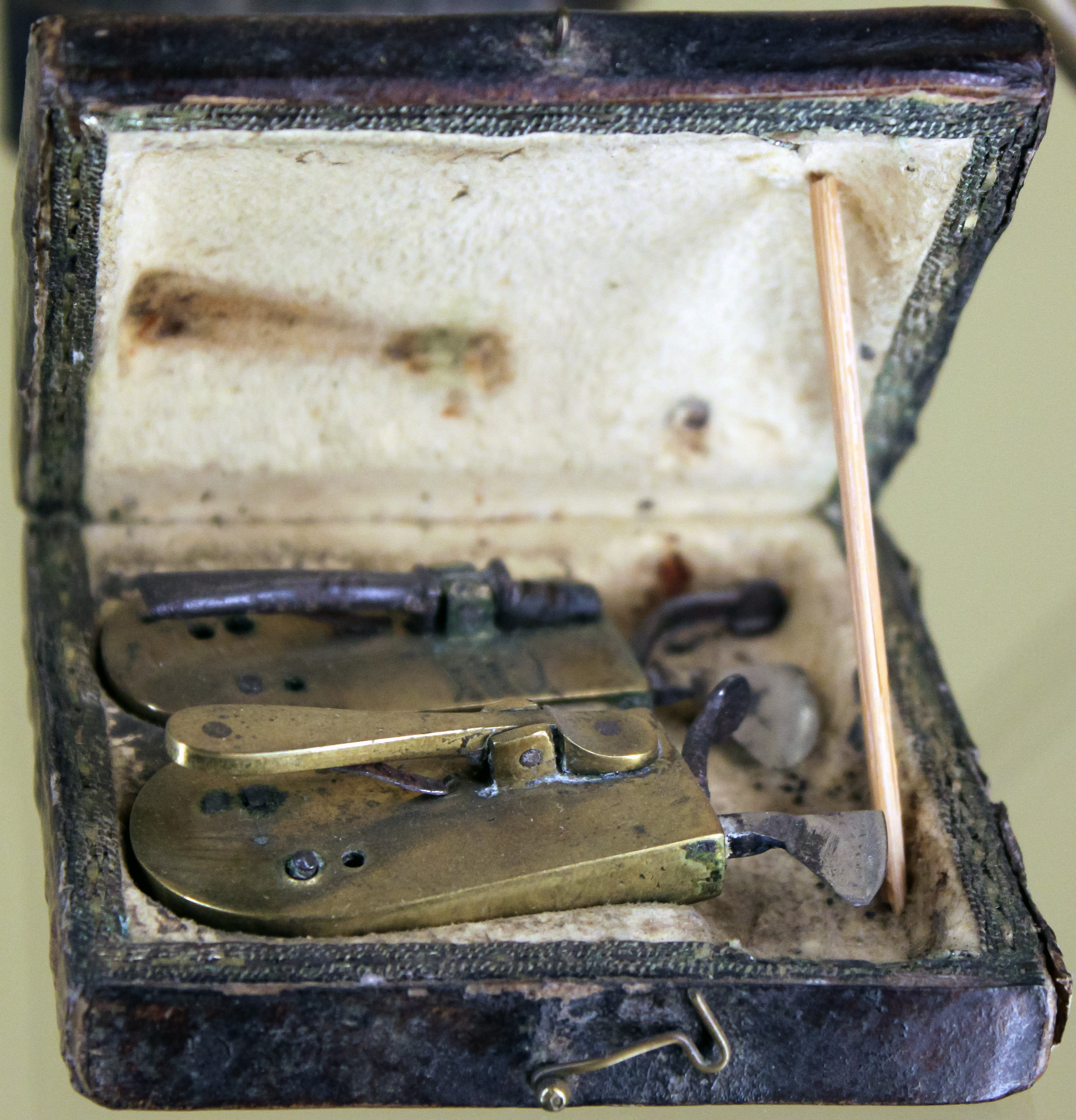
Bloodletting set of a barber surgeon, beginning of 19th century, Märkisches Museum Berlin

The barber surgeon was one of the most common European medical practitioners of the Middle Ages, generally charged with caring for soldiers during and after battle. In this era, surgery was seldom conducted by physicians. Instead, barbers, who possessed razors and dexterity, were responsible for tasks ranging from cutting hair to pulling teeth to amputating limbs.

In this period, surgical mortality was very high due to blood loss, shock and infection. Yet, since doctors thought that bloodletting to balance "humours" would improve health, barbers also used bloodletting razors and applied leeches. Meanwhile, physicians considered themselves to be above surgery. Physicians mostly observed during surgery and offered consulting, but otherwise often chose academia or working in universities.

== Middle Ages in Europe ==
Due to religious and sanitary monastic regulations, monks had to maintain their tonsure (the traditional baldness on the top of the head of Catholic monks). This created a market for barbers, because each monastery had to train or hire a barber. They would perform bloodletting and minor surgeries, pull teeth and prepare ointments. The first barber surgeons to be recognized as such worked in monasteries around AD 1000.

Because physicians performed surgery so rarely, the Middle Ages saw a proliferation of barbers, among other medical "paraprofessionals", including cataract couchers, herniotomists, lithotomists, midwives, and pig gelders. In 1254, Bruno da Longobucco, an Italian physician who wrote about surgery, expressed concern about barbers performing phlebotomies and scarifications.

== Barbers in France and Italy ==
In 16th-century Paris, barber-surgery was divided into two categories: "surgeons of the short robe" and "surgeons of the long robe". "Surgeons of the Long Robe", a qualification offered in institutions such as the College of St. Cosme, required students to take a formal exam. This was opposed to "Surgeons of the Short Robe", who did not need to take an exam to qualify and, alongside barbering, would perform minor surgical procedures. However, despite the different education requirements, both types of surgeons were called "barber-surgeons". This distinction between "short coat" and "long coat" continued in surgery until relatively recently. Eventually, in 1660, the barber surgeons recognized the physicians' dominance.

=== France ===
From the 1540s in France, the translation into French of the works of ancient authors allowed progress in the transmission of knowledge: barber-surgeons could add to their manual skills, and ancient surgical knowledge could be conformed to actual practice.

New problems arose in war surgery, without equivalents in the past: wounds caused by firearms and mutilations caused by artillery. The barber-surgeon was required to treat all the effects on the surface of the body, the doctor treating those on the inside.

There was already social mobility between surgeons and barber-surgeons. A surgeon's apprenticeship began with the practice of shaving. The young surgeon could thus have a source of income before mastering the surgery of his time. In the context of Renaissance humanism, this practical experience took place outside of academic scholasticism. The action is clearly sanctioned by the results, visible to all. For Michel de Montaigne, compared to medicine:

Surgery seems to me much more certain, because it sees and handles what it does; there is less to conjecture and guess.

=== Italy ===
In Italy, barbers were not as common. The Salerno medical school trained physicians to be competent surgeons, as did the schools in Bologna and Padua. In Florence, physicians and surgeons were separate, but the Florentine Statute concerning the Art of Physicians and Pharmacists in 1349 gave barbers an inferior legal status compared to surgeons.

== Barbers in Spain ==
Surgical practices in the Iberian Peninsula date back to the Megalithic era (2000 BC), with evidence of trepanation. Until the Renaissance, Spanish surgery followed Greek, Arab, and medieval traditions, with significant progress in the 16th century through anatomical studies. Despite this, military, naval, and barber-surgeons performed operations, as physicians distanced themselves from surgery. A royal decree regulated barber-surgeons in Spain. There were active barber surgeons operating in Valencia in the 15th century. One notable practitioner was Antonio Fernando de Medrano, a professional barber surgeon active in Madrid during the 17th century.

The establishment of surgical chairs in Spanish universities in the late 16th century gave surgery social and academic recognition, but a standardized system emerged only in the 18th century with the Reales Colegios de Cirugía (Royal Colleges of Surgeons), founded by military surgeons. The first institutions in Cádiz (1748) and Barcelona (1764), led by Virgili, were followed by Madrid (1780), founded by Antoni de Gimbernat. These colleges formally integrated surgery into medical education, solidifying its scientific status.

== Barbers in the British Isles in the early modern period ==
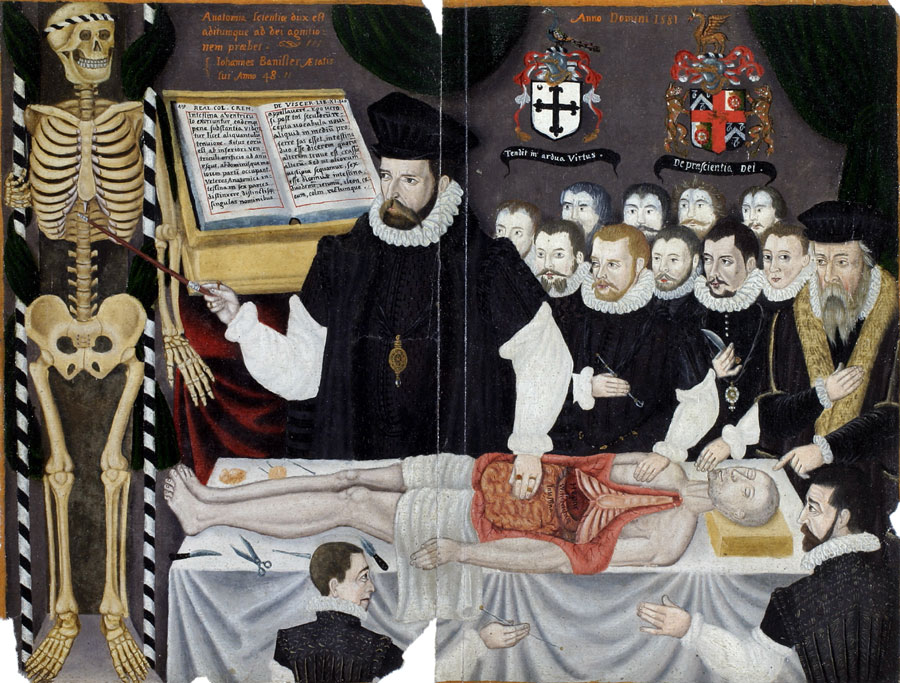
Master John Banister's Anatomical Tables, with Figures. The paintings comprise a portrait of Banister delivering a visceral lecture at the Barber-Surgeons' Hall, Monkwell Street, London. c. 1580

Formal recognition of surgeons' skills (in England at least) goes back to 1540, when the Fellowship of Surgeons (who existed as a distinct profession but were not "Doctors/Physicians" for reasons including that, as a trade, they were trained by apprenticeship rather than academically) merged with the Company of Barbers, a London livery company, to form the Company of Barber-Surgeons. However, the trade was gradually put under pressure by the medical profession and in 1745, the surgeons split from the Barbers' Company (which still exists) to form the Company of Surgeons. In 1800 a royal charter was granted to this company and the Royal College of Surgeons in London came into being. Later it was renamed to cover all of England—equivalent colleges exist for Scotland and Ireland as well as many of the old UK colonies (e.g., Canada).

== Barbers in medieval Finland ==
There are few studies on barber surgeons in Finland. The first known account is that of Hinzikinus from 1324 to 1326, originating from Turku (Åbo), a city in the southern region of the country, who provided medical preparation and wound care for Viceroy Matts Kettilmundson. The second barber surgeon documented was Henrik Bardskärare, who worked in the castle of Viborg in Finland (Vyborg, now part of Russia). Each company of 400–500 men in the Swedish Army was assigned a barber during the rule of King Gustav I Vasa in the 16th century. A barber surgeon was available to tend to the injured in almost every division. In 1571, the barbers organized into a professional guild that governed their training, jobs, pay, and the number of barbers. Barbers from other countries could join the guild as well. The guild mandated that barber surgeons receive their training from established masters as apprentices, and in order to receive their degrees, the apprentices had to pass an exam. The guild provided guidelines for the barber surgeons' fees or pay, which varied and occasionally depended on how many patients were treated and surgeries were carried out.

== Traditions in the 21st century ==
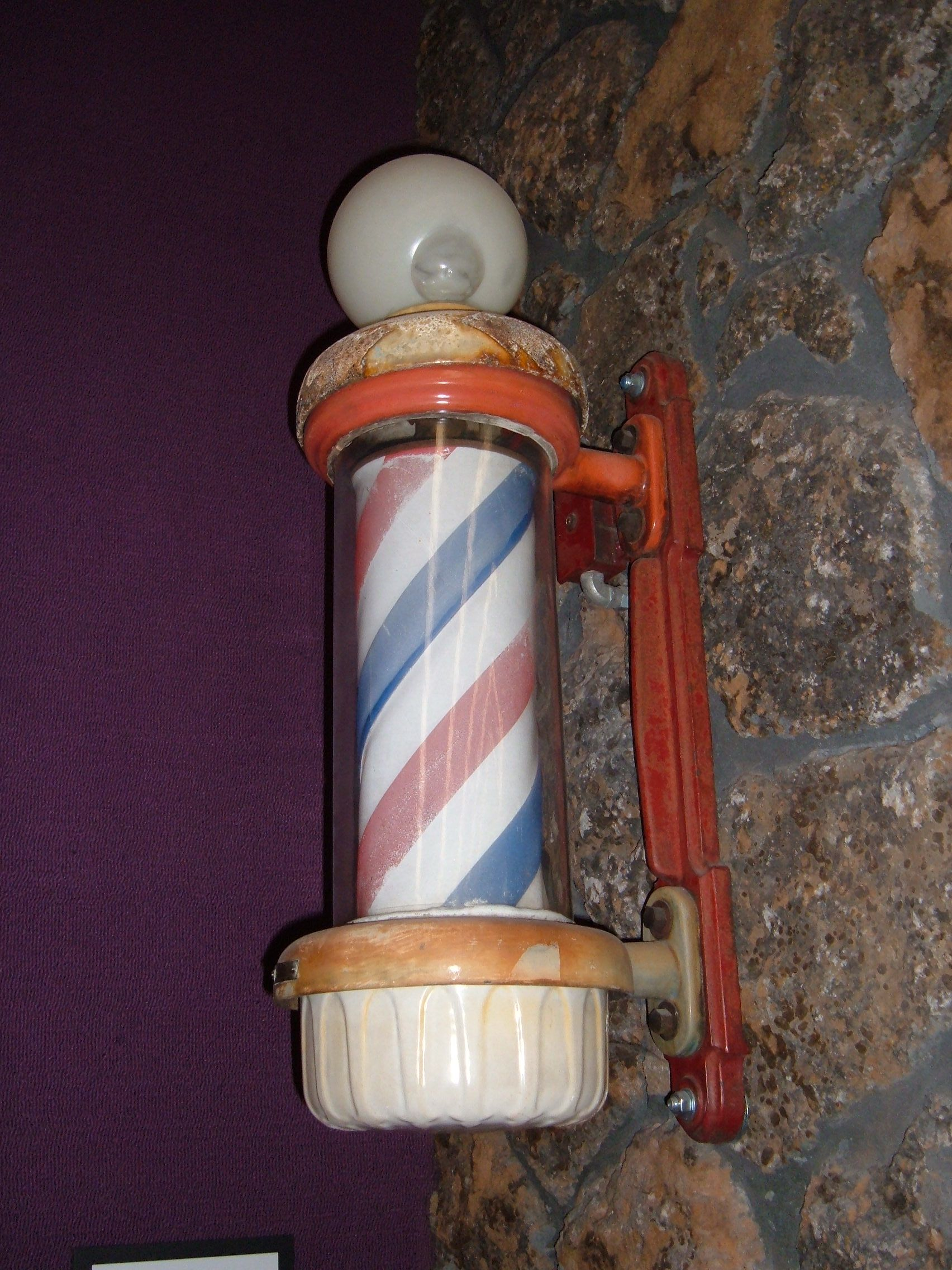
Barbers advertised their profession with a pole, a tradition dating back to the Middle Ages. This pole belonged to Carl Schulz, father of the famous cartoonist.

Few traces of barbers' links with the surgical side of the medical profession remain. One is the traditional red and white barber's pole, or a modified instrument from a blacksmith, which is said to represent the blood and bandages associated with their historical role.

In the United Kingdom, Ireland, Australia, New Zealand, and South Africa, another vestige is the use of the titles Mr, Ms, Mrs, or Miss rather than Dr by physicians when they complete their surgery qualifications by, for example, the award of an MRCS or FRCS diploma. This practice dates back to the days when surgeons were not required to obtain a university education in medicine, and is retained despite the fact that all surgeons in these countries must earn a medical degree and spend additional years in surgical training and certification.

== Historic barber surgeons ==
- Martín de Porres — a 16- to 17th-century Peruvian lay brother of the Dominican Order, barber surgeon, and saint. He is the patron saint of barbers.
- Ambroise Paré — a pioneering surgeon of 16th-century France when barbers also performed surgery.
- Johanna Hedén — a midwife who, in the late 19th century, became the first female barber surgeon in Sweden.
- Magdalena Bendzisławska — a 17th-century barber-surgeon in Poland and the first woman surgeon there.
- Peter Proby — the 16th-century barber of Sir Francis Walsingham who became Master of the Worshipful Company of Barbers and Lord Mayor of London.
- Hernando de Bustamante — a 16th-century Spanish sailor and barber surgeon who is best known as one of the few survivors of the first circumnavigation of the globe. He sailed on the Magellan expedition from 1519 to 1522.
- Antoni de Gimbernat — an 18th-century Spanish surgeon and anatomist. He is known for laying the groundwork for modern techniques of inguinal hernia repair.
- Antonio Fernando de Medrano — a 17th-century Basque barber-surgeon and a pioneer of medical professionalism in Spain.
- Elinor Sneshell — a 16th-century English barber-surgeon, active during the reign of Elizabeth I of England.
- The Barber surgeon of Avebury — a skeleton discovered in 1938 at Avebury henge monument in Wiltshire, England.
- Diego Álvarez Chanca — a 15th-century Spanish barber surgeon who accompanied Christopher Columbus on his second voyage.
- David Samwell — an 18th-century Welsh barber surgeon and poet. He was an important supporter of Welsh cultural organisations and was known by the pseudonym Dafydd Ddu Feddyg.

== Organizations and fellowships ==
- Worshipful Company of Barbers
- Royal College of Surgeons of England, formally known as the Company of Barber-Surgeons
- Royal College of Surgeons of Edinburgh, originally the Edinburgh Guild of Barbers and Surgeons

== See also ==
- List of barbers
- City physician
- Feldsher
