= Transmission chain =

Transmission chain of chain of transmission may refer to:

- Airchain, the path or route an audio or video signal takes on its way through a radio station or television station
- Chain drive, a way of transmitting mechanical power from one place to another
- Chain of infection, a general chain of events that applies to infections
- Isnad, the chain of transmission of a hadith
- Transmission chain method in information propagation
