= Royal College of Surgeons =

Generic term for one of six professional bodies of surgeons

The Royal College of Surgeons is a generic term which may be applied to any of six professional bodies worldwide. The Colleges are located in and are named for England, Edinburgh, Glasgow, Australasia and Canada. They are independent organisations but all have the same core functions, namely the teaching, training, and assessment of surgeons and the maintenance of surgical standards. Four of the Royal Colleges, those of England, Edinburgh, Ireland and Australasia are concerned primarily with surgical and dental surgical matters, while those in Canada and Glasgow deal also with the education and assessment of physicians. Another college, the Royal College of Dental Surgeons of Ontario, is concerned with the regulation of dentists in the province of Ontario, Canada.

The Colleges, with the year in which they received Royal status, are the:

- Royal College of Surgeons of Edinburgh (1778)
- Royal College of Surgeons in Ireland (1784)
- Royal College of Surgeons of England (1800)
- Royal College of Physicians and Surgeons of Canada (1929)
- Royal Australasian College of Surgeons (1930)
- Royal College of Physicians and Surgeons of Glasgow (1962)
- Royal College of Dental Surgeons of Ontario (1868).

== History of the Colleges ==
The Royal College of Surgeons of Edinburgh originated as the medieval craft Guild of Surgeons and Barbers which became the Incorporation of Surgeons and Barbers in 1505 with the award of a charter. This charter received Royal approval from King James IV the following year. The barbers left the Incorporation 1722. In 1778 King George III granted a new charter by which the Incorporation became The Royal College of Surgeons of the City of Edinburgh. As the organisation has been in continued existence since the 16th century, it maintains a continuous list of all its fellows from 1581 to the present day..

The Royal College of Surgeons in Ireland is the lineal descendant of the 1784 Dublin Society of Surgeons. The earlier Guild of Barbers of Dublin, had received a Royal Charter from King Henry VI in 1446 and a further charter in 1687 expanded the guild to include apothecaries and periwig-makers, so that the voting power of the surgeons in the guild was greatly diminished. In 1784 a group of Dublin surgeons, frustrated with this arrangement, broke away from the guild to form the Dublin Society of Surgeons. This society petitioned King George III for a Royal charter. Despite the opposition of the Guild of Barber-Surgeons, the Royal College of Surgeons in Ireland was created in 1784.

The Royal College of Surgeons of England arose from the Guild of Surgeons which was established in 1435. The guild engaged in a power struggle with the more dominant Company of Barbers until King Henry VIII formally united the barbers and surgeons in 1540 and they became the Worshipful Company of Barbers and Surgeons. In 1745 the surgeons broke away from the barbers to form the Company of Surgeons. In 1800 the Company was granted a Royal Charter to become the Royal College of Surgeons in London. A further charter in 1843 granted it the present title of the Royal College of Surgeons of England.

The Royal College of Physicians and Surgeons of Canada was established by Act of Parliament in 1929.

The Royal Australasian College of Surgeons had its origins in 1925 when a group of Australasian surgeons visited the meeting of the American College of Surgeons to observe the structure and functions of a surgical college. When the Australasian Medical Congress met two years later, those surgeons presented detailed proposals for the formation of a surgical college and this was agreed. The Royal status was conferred in 1930 by letters patent.

The Royal College of Physicians and Surgeons of Glasgow was established in 1599 by a charter from King James VI. It was termed a faculty, but had the same functions as a medical Royal College. The institution was given Royal status in 1909 when it became the Royal Faculty of Physicians and Surgeons of Glasgow. It was renamed as a Royal College in 1962.

== See also ==
- Membership of the Royal College of Surgeons
- Fellowship of the Royal College of Surgeons
