= Magdalena Bendzisławska =

Polish surgeon

- Occupations: Barber surgeon, doctor
- Years active: fl. late 17th century (from 1697)
- Known for: First official female surgeon in Polish history
- Medical career
- Profession: Surgeon
- Field: Surgery; dentistry; ophthalmology
- Institutions: Wieliczka Salt Mine
- Sub-specialties: Traumatology, cataract removal, wound dressing

Magdalena Bendzisławska (fl. late 17th century) was a Polish doctor and surgeon for miners of the Wieliczka Salt Mine and their families. She is considered the first official female surgeon in Polish history.

== Life and work ==
Magdalena was the wife of Walenty Bendzisławski, a Barber Surgeon working at the salt mine in Wieliczka near Kraków in southern Poland. The couple lived next to the mine where workers routinely suffered from many kinds of injuries, contusions and fractures and came to the barber for medical attention. Magdalena began as her husband's assistant as he tended to patients as a doctor and surgeon.

She advanced through all career levels and completed three years of internship during her husband's lifetime. With her training, she became a half-companion and then a companion in the barbers' guild. When her husband died, she took over his business, which was a common course of action at the time, but she decided to do the barbering work herself, breaking with tradition and not employing a barber-journeyman to perform the actual procedures. Officially, she obtained the right to practice her profession by virtue of a royal diploma issued by King Augustus II the Strong on 6 October 1697. The privilege admitted that she was a surgeon perfect in her craft and had the right, knowledge and skills to take over her husband's duties as a saltworks doctor.

In 1698, she took advantage of the presence of the Visiting Commission in the mine and applied for confirmation of the right to practice her profession. She presented two privileges: one granted to her husband in 1694 and one granted to her in 1697. The commission granted her the rights and privileges of a member of the barbers' guild. She had to complete several steps: take an oath; present a set of tools (a box with razors, scissors, combs, tooth forceps, dental tweezers, a jar of leeches and others) and demonstrate the ability to make ointments and dressings; and know anatomy and be able to use medicines for internal injuries. In her professional practice, she performed dental, surgical and ophthalmological procedures, such as removing cataracts and foreign bodies from the eye. She also immobilized fractures, removed teeth, dressed wounds and performed bloodletting.

She was the first woman in Poland to obtain a surgeon's diploma and the first barber known by her given name and surname.

== Commemorations ==
- In 2011, the Magdalena Bendzisławska medal was established to be awarded to distinguished oral surgeons. It was designed by medalist Małgorzata Kotówna and constructed in Kraków. The winners have included: Jadwiga Stypułkowska (2011), Maria Panaś (2018), Grażyna Wyszyńska-Pawelec (2019).
- On 25 May 2012, a plaque commemorating Bendzisławska was unveiled in the salt mine in Wieliczka.
- In 2021, the comic book Karolina and Klara was published titled Medallion of Time by Sebastian Frąckiewicz and Anna Krztoń. One of the heroines is Bendzisławska. The comic book was published by the Kosmos dla Girls Foundation. Before the book version was released, the comic book was published in the magazine Kosmos dla Dzieciek. Bendzisławska also appears in Anna Dziewitt-Meller's publication Lady, Girls, Girls. History in a Skirt (2020).
- In 2021, the Superhero Academy card game about Polish scientists, prepared by Tomasz Rożek as part of the Superhero Academy project, was released with Bendzisławska as one of its heroines.
