= Cultural attractor theory =

Cultural attractor theory focuses on how ideas being modified as they are transmitted between humans affects cultural evolution. In cultural attractor theory, a cultural attractor is a "destination" that cultural ideas tend to go towards over time. To say that there is an attractor is just to say that, in a given space of possibilities, transformation probabilities form a certain pattern: they tend to be biased so as to favor transformations in the direction of some specific point, and therefore cluster at and around that point. Cultural attraction theory explains why some representations, practices and artifacts are more prevalent and robustly transmitted than others by looking at the micro-mechanisms involved in their transmission.

A good example of a cultural attractor is language learnability. It has been demonstrated that learners bias the evolution of language towards learnability. This could explain why words can exhibit a high level of macro stability, and why the most frequent and stable words are also the shortest.

The transmission chain method may be used to study cultural attractors.
