= Thomas Vicary =

English physician, surgeon and anatomist

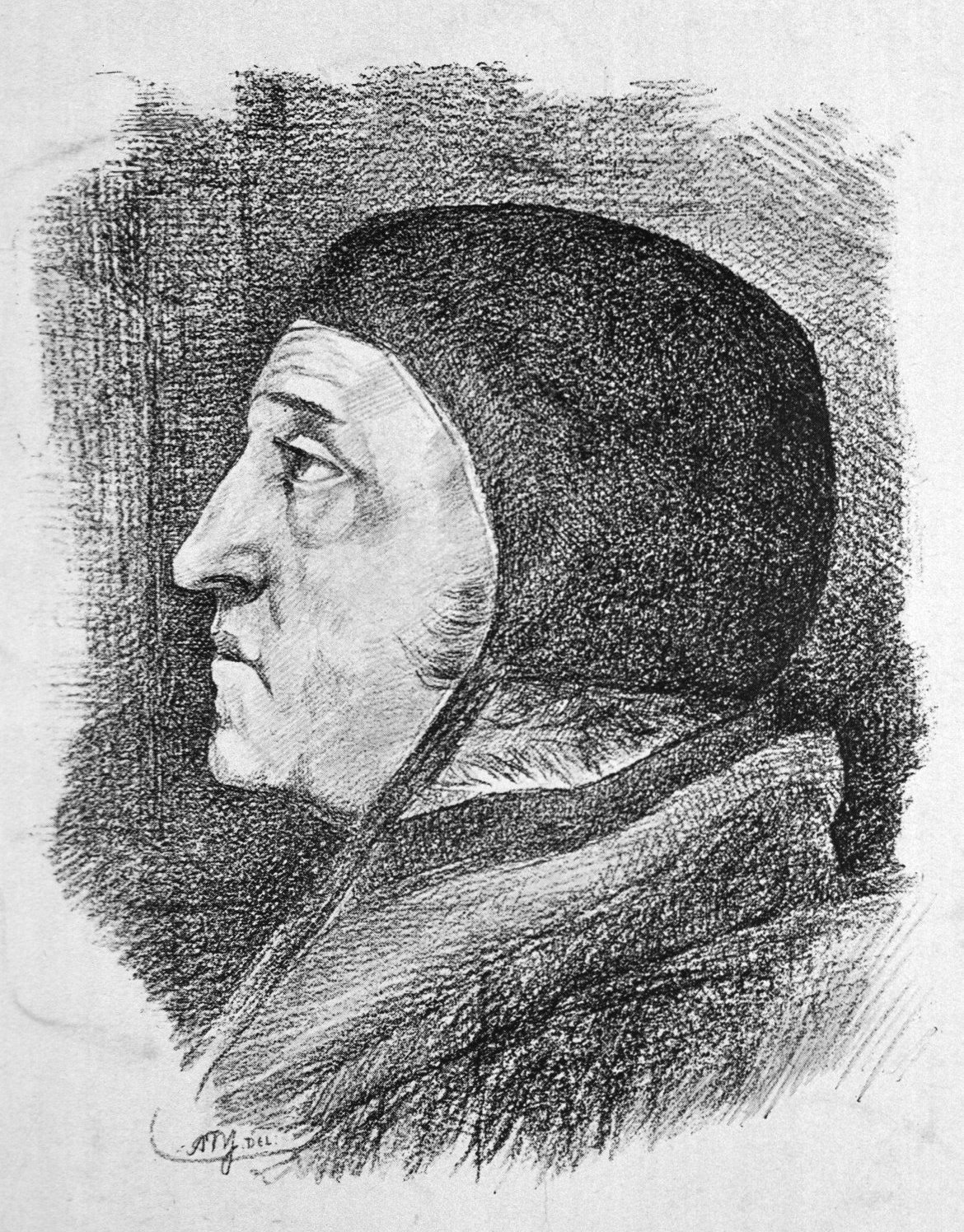
Thomas Vicary

Thomas Vicary (c. 1490–1561) was an early English physician, surgeon and anatomist.

Vicary was born in Kent, in about 1490. He was described as "but a meane practiser in Maidstone … that had gained his knowledge by experience, until the King advanced him for curing his sore leg". Henry VIII advanced him to the position of sergeant-surgeon to the Royal Household, and he became a leading surgeon in the City of London, becoming the first master of the Company of Barber-Surgeons and again on three further occasions. He played a leading role in the 1540 Act of Union of the two guilds, appearing in Hans Holbein the Younger's painting showing the King handing the charter to Vicary himself. Vicary obtained an annual right to the cadavers of four executed criminals for the Barber-Surgeons, and established the first formal teaching of anatomy at their hall.

In 1546, he was appointed the first superintendent of St Bartholomew's Hospital. In 1548, he was appointed resident surgical governor of St Bartholomew's Hospital, a post he held until his death. On Henry's death he continued to serve the Tudor monarchs as physician.

One of the earliest works in anatomy was attributed to him, The anatomy of mans body; but it appears he republished and edited an earlier work of the Middle Ages.

The Royal College of Surgeons maintains an annual lecture in his honour.

== Works ==
- The Englisheman's Treasure (1586)

== See also ==
- History of anatomy
