= Frederic Bartlett =

British psychologist and academic

Sir Frederic Bartlett
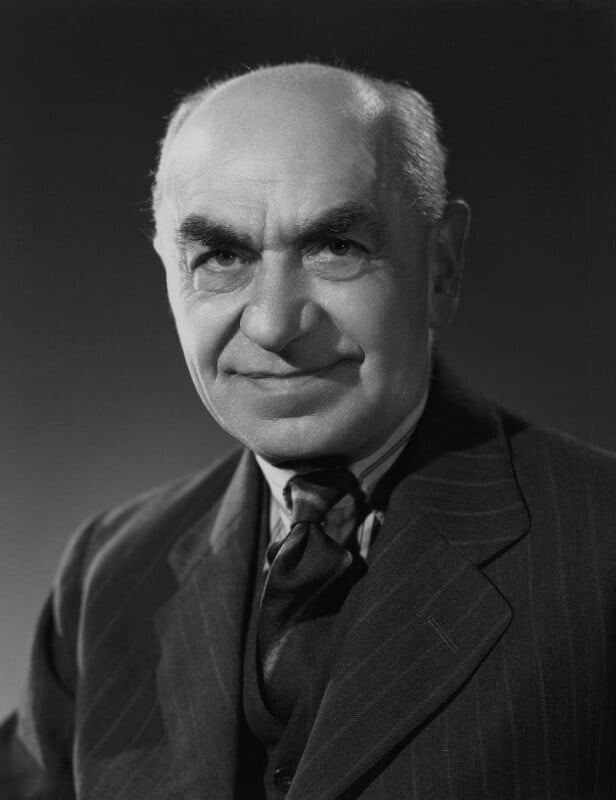
- Bartlett in 1948
- Born: 20 October 1886; Stow-on-the-Wold, England
- Died: 30 September 1969 (aged 82); Cambridge, England
- Known for: Memory schema Transmission chain method
- Awards: Royal Medal (1952); Fellow of the Royal Society
- Scientific career
- Fields: Psychology
- Workplaces: St John's College, Cambridge

Sir Frederic Charles Bartlett FRS (20 October 1886 – 30 September 1969) was a British psychologist and the first professor of experimental psychology at the University of Cambridge. He was one of the forerunners of cognitive psychology as well as cultural psychology. Bartlett considered most of his own work on cognitive psychology to be a study in social psychology, but he was also interested in anthropology, moral science, philosophy, and sociology. Bartlett proudly referred to himself as "a Cambridge psychologist" because while he was at the University of Cambridge, settling for one type of psychology was not an option.

== Biography ==
Frederic Bartlett was born on 20 October 1886 into a middle-class family and raised in Gloucestershire, England. He suffered from pleurisy at a young age, causing him to be homeschooled during his secondary years of education. Despite this, he partook in sports such as golf, tennis, and cricket.

In 1909, Bartlett graduated First Class Honours with a Bachelor of Arts degree in philosophy at The University Correspondence College. He continued his education at London University where he achieved his master's degree with a distinction in both ethics and sociology. Continuing his education at St John's College, Cambridge, Barlett received a distinction in moral science. Here, he also met Charles Samuel Myers, the Director of the Cambridge Psychology Laboratory. The effects of Bartlett's childhood illnesses kept him from participating in World War I. He became deputy head of the Cambridge Psychology Laboratory in 1914 when Myers was drafted into the war as a medical doctor.

Bartlett's experimental work at this time focused on perception and imaging which contributed to his appointment as a Fellow in 1917. Soon after the war ended, Myers left his Cambridge position, leaving a large donation to finance department lectureships. Bartlett became the Director of the Laboratory and Lecturer of Experimental Psychology. Bartlett later attained the title of Senior Lecturer of Psychology, a post which he held until his death in 1969 at the age of 82.

== Psychology and Primitive Culture (1923) ==
Bartlett's first book in psychology developed a framework to understand human action in cultural context. In contrast to his most famous experimental work (see below) he here develops his argument through his readings of ethnographic sources. In fact, Bartlett had originally wanted to go into anthropology but was encouraged by his mentor W.H.R. Rivers to train as a psychologist first. In Psychology and Primitive Culture, he explores in particular what happens when groups come into contact with each other and what factors condition the exchange and adoption of culture between the groups. The book is also noteworthy in its argument against Lucien Lévy-Bruhl's notion of the 'primitive mind'.

== Remembering (1932) ==
Bartlett was the Chair of Experimental Psychology at Cambridge when he published the book he is most famously recognised for: Remembering (1932). The book explored Bartlett's concept of conventionalization in psychology. It was an assemblage of his past works, including experiments testing the ability to remember using figures, photographs, and stories. Specifically, Remembering consisted of experimental studies on remembering, imaging, and perceiving, and "remembering as a study in social psychology." His Theory of Remembering involved social conditions that were influential to remembering, along with comparisons such as "free remembering" to special circumstances of remembering. The book provided an in depth analysis of Bartlett's schema theory, which has continued to inspire scientists studying schema theories today.

Bartlett is also credited for the transmission chain method. Studies based on the method are described in the book.

=== "War of the Ghosts" ===
The "War of the Ghosts" experiment from Remembering (1932) was Bartlett's most famous study and demonstrated the reconstructive nature of memory, and how it can be influenced by the subject's own schema. A memory is constructive when a person gives their opinion about what had happened in the memory, along with additional influences such as their experiences, knowledge, and expectations.

In the experiment, Bartlett assigned his Edwardian English participants to read the Native American Folklore titled "War of the Ghosts". Participants were told to remember the story at extended intervals numerous times. Bartlett found that at longer intervals between reading the story and remembering it, participants were less accurate and forgot much of the information from the story. Most importantly, where the elements of the story failed to fit into the schemata of the listener, these elements were omitted from the recollection, or transformed into more familiar forms. Each participant's report of the story mirrored his or her own culture, Edwardian English culture in this case. An example of this can be demonstrated by some of these participants remembering "canoes" from the story as "boats".

== Applied experimental psychology and war efforts ==
After the publication of Remembering (1932), Bartlett's concerns centred on determining stronger methodologies for social psychology by combining psychology and anthropology. Bartlett, along with colleagues from subjects of psychology, anthropology, and sociology, met twice a year from 1935 to 1938 to collaborate. Bartlett's interest in Applied Experimental Psychology expanded, specifically in regard to the subject of the militia when the Applied Psychology Unit was established at the Cambridge Laboratory of Industrial Research. He and Kenneth Craik were responsible for setting up the Medical Research Council's Applied Psychology Research Unit (APU) at Cambridge in 1944, where they worked with experimental psychologist Magdalen Dorothea Vernon. Together their applied research focused on issues directed from government agencies, including training and experimental designs. Bartlett became the Director of the Unit after Craik's early death in 1945. Bartlett successfully took charge of this lectureship aimed towards military efforts. Expanding upon Craik's past work on "bodily skills" appealed to Bartlett possibly because of his passion for sports during his childhood years. At this time, institutions in England and the United States bestowed numerous awards to Bartlett for his explanations of the adaptive synthesis of movements that humans create given any new situation.

== Thinking (1958) ==
In 1958, Bartlett published Thinking: An Experimental and Social Study. He recognised various thinking processes that humans use, relating back to the methods he exercised in Remembering (1932) such as story recollection. Experiments on completion were done, where participants were shown open ended stories and told to finish them realistically. What he found was that "completion appears even unconsciously, and sheds light on how schemas, as a way of organizing past experiences, lead one towards constructive and predictive processes".

== Honours ==
In 1922, Bartlett was chosen as Director of Psychological Laboratory in Cambridge and awarded a chair in experimental psychology in 1931. The same year he published Remembering (1932), Bartlett became a Fellow of the Royal Society. In 1944, Bartlett became the Director of the Unit for Research in Applied Psychology. Bartlett's contributions during World War II granted him C.B.E in 1941 and awarded him medals from The Royal Society in 1943. He was elected to the American Philosophical Society in 1945 and the United States National Academy of Sciences in 1947. He was appointed honoris causa by the University of Athens in 1937, Princeton in 1947, and the University of London and the University of Louvain in 1949. In 1948, Bartlett delivered the Royal Institution Christmas Lectures on The Mind at Work and Play. This also marked the year Bartlett was knighted for services to the Royal Air Force, on the basis of his wartime work in applied psychology. In 1950, Bartlett was awarded Presidency at the British Psychological Society. He was elected to the American Academy of Arts and Sciences in 1958.

After his retirement in 1951, Bartlett continued receiving honoris causa from various universities. In 1952, he was awarded the Royal Medal and the Longacre Award of the Aeromedical Association. Between 1952 and 1963, National Psychological Societies of Spain, Sweden, Italy, Turkey, and Switzerland elected him as an honorary member. He was recognised by the International Experimental Psychology Society in 1958 and was selected by The North American National Academy of Science and the North American Academy of Arts to be a foreign associate member in 1959. Today, the UK Ergonomics Society awards a Bartlett medal in his honour, and the Experimental Psychology Society holds an annual Bartlett Lecture.

== Books ==
- Exercises in logic (Clive, London, 1922)
- Psychology and Primitive Culture (Cambridge University Press, Cambridge, 1923)
- Psychology And The Soldier (Cambridge University Press, Cambridge, 1927)
- Remembering: A Study in Experimental and Social Psychology (Cambridge University Press, Cambridge, 1932)
- The Problem of Noise (Cambridge University Press, Cambridge, 1934)
- Political Propaganda (Cambridge University Press, Cambridge, 1940)
- Religion as Experience, Belief and Action (Cumberledge, London, 1950)
- The Mind at Work and Play (Allen and Unwin, London, 1951)
- Thinking: An Experimental and Social Study (Allen and Unwin, 1958)
