= Elinor Sneshell =

English barber surgeon

Elinor Sneshell (fl. 1593) was an English barber-surgeon, active during the reign of Elizabeth I of England.

In the 1593 Returns of Strangers in the Metropolis, she was listed as a widow originating from Valenciennes who had been resident in London for 26 years. Alongside Elizabeth Moulthorne of Antwerp, Sneshell was one of only two known female barber-surgeons who practised during this period.

As a barber-surgeon, Sneshell was charged with caring for wounded soldiers during war. In the Middle Ages, surgery was often not performed by surgeons, but rather by barbers who were charged with tasks such as surgical procedures, teeth pulling, bleeding or applying blood suckers.
