= Bloodstopping =

Supernatural means to stop bleeding

Bloodstopping refers to an American folk practice once common in the Ozarks and the Appalachians, Canadian lumbercamps and the northern woods of the United States. It was believed (and still is) that certain persons, known as bloodstoppers, could halt bleeding in humans and animals by supernatural means. The most common method was to walk east and recite Ezekiel 16:6. This is referred to as the blood verse.

And when I passed by thee, and saw thee polluted in thine own blood, I said unto thee when thou wast in thy blood, Live; yea, I said unto thee when thou wast in thy blood, Live.

== History ==
Bloodstopping was used in areas of North American where modern medicine was not reachable. Many of these communities had one or two bloodstoppers in their community. Since they were able to help when doctors were unavailable they became very popular in their community and were well respected. Bloodstopping was used mostly in the Ozarks, in the states Illinois, Missouri, and Arkansas. Each bloodstopper used their own technique to fix wounds. The person performing the bloodstopping must have been given the power to do so. The gift was mostly passed down through family (older to younger). It can only be passed down to the opposite sex. It can only be told to three people, with the third person gaining the power. The person performing it does not need to believe in it fully or be sinless since the blood verse is so powerful.

Throughout Europe Christianity was becoming the main religion. However those who lived in rural areas were not as quick to convert. They were more fond of polytheistic religions since they had been used to it for so many years. German settlers who ended up in the Appalachians had many folk beliefs about magic. At first they used stars to determine planting cycles and to predict weather. When medical treatment became scarce they turned to other forms of medicine. This is when bloodstopping became a practice.
