= Johanna Hedén =

Swedish midwife

Johanna Maria Hedén
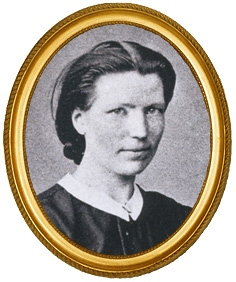
- Hedén in 1886
- Born: Johanna Maria Bowall; 21 July 1837
- Died: December 1912 (aged 74–75)
- Education: Sundhetskollegium
- Occupations: Barber surgeon, apothecary, and barber
- Known for: First known formally educated and trained female surgeon in Sweden

Johanna Maria Hedén, née Bowall (21 July 1837 – December 1912) was a Swedish midwife, Feldsher (or barber surgeon), apothecary, and barber. She is the first known licensed female feldsher in Sweden and as such the first known formally educated and trained female surgeon in Sweden.

== Life ==
Johanna Hedén was born in a poor family. Her mother died in childbirth because of an incompetent midwife. Her father denied her education because of her gender and provided her a position as a domestic in Stockholm. Her employer, however, persuaded her brother to allow her to study.

Hedén took her license as a midwife in 1858, after which she also trained as an apothecary. At that time, feldsher- and barber was the title for a surgeon who performed less complicated surgical operations. Johanna Hedén made her oath and took her exam as a barber- and feldsher surgeon at the Sundhetskollegium on 7 August 1863, thereby formally making her the first trained female surgeon in Sweden, granting her the permission to be professionally active in this field. She herself formally commented on this: "I took my exam as a feldsher to great discontent of my male colleagues, and after this I practiced at industrial estates and often assisted at injuries".

In 1867, Hedén became a teacher at the obstetrics institution i Gothenburg. Johanna Hedén founded Göteborgs Barnmorskesällskap (Gothenburg Midwifery Association) in 1885, which was the first union for women in her country; Svenska Barnmorskeförbundet (Swedish Midwifery Association) in 1886, and the paper Jordemodern for midwives in 1888.

Hedén was married and had a daughter who, however, died at the age of one in 1877.

== Legacy ==
A street in Gothenburg was named after Johanna Hedén.

There is a statue of Johanna Hedén by Inga-Louise Lindgren in front of the Östra Hospital in Gothenburg.

== Sources ==
- Johanna Maria Bowall i Wilhelmina Stålberg: Anteckningar om svenska qvinnor (1864)
- Idun 1895. Biografi om Johanna Hedén
- Pia Höjeberg: Jordemor (2011)
