= Worshipful Company of Barbers =

Professional guild of the City of London

Coordinates: 51.51803°N 0.09466°W

The Worshipful Company of Barbers
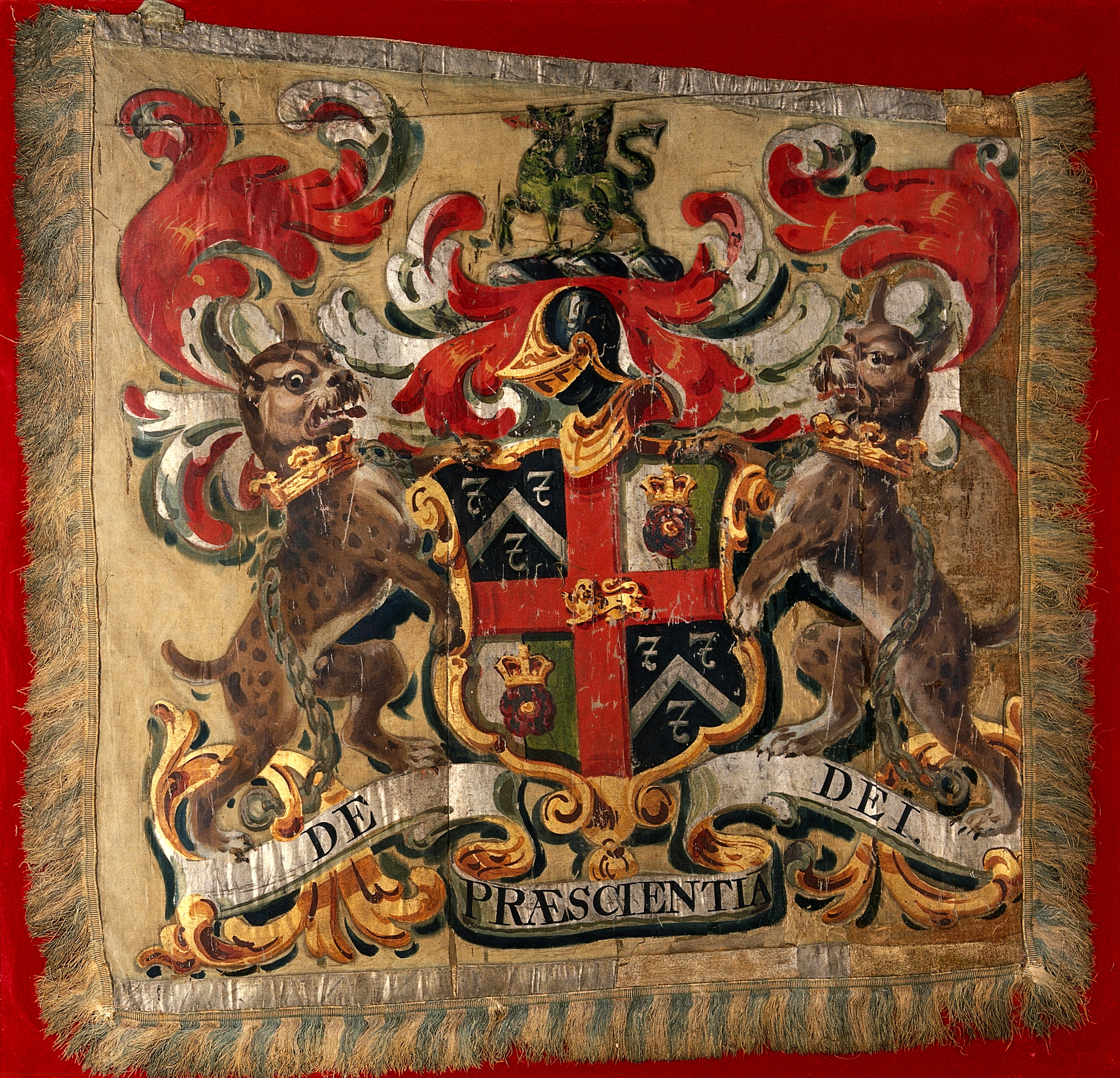
- Motto: De Praescientia Dei
- Location: Barber-Surgeons' Hall; Monkwell Square, London
- Date of formation: before 1308
- Company association: Surgery, Barbering
- Order of precedence: 17th
- Master of company: The Hon Mrs Virginia Lovell JP DL DStJ (2026–2027)
- Website: http://www.barberscompany.org

The Worshipful Company of Barbers is one of the livery companies of the City of London, and ranks 17th in precedence.

The Fellowship of Surgeons merged with the Barbers' Company in 1540, forming the Company of Barbers and Surgeons but after the rising professionalism of the trade broke away in 1745 to form what would become the Royal College of Surgeons.

The company no longer retains an association with the hairdressing profession, and principally acts as a charitable institution for medical and surgical causes. In modern times, between one-third and one-half of the company's liverymen are surgeons, dentists or other medical practitioners.

== History ==
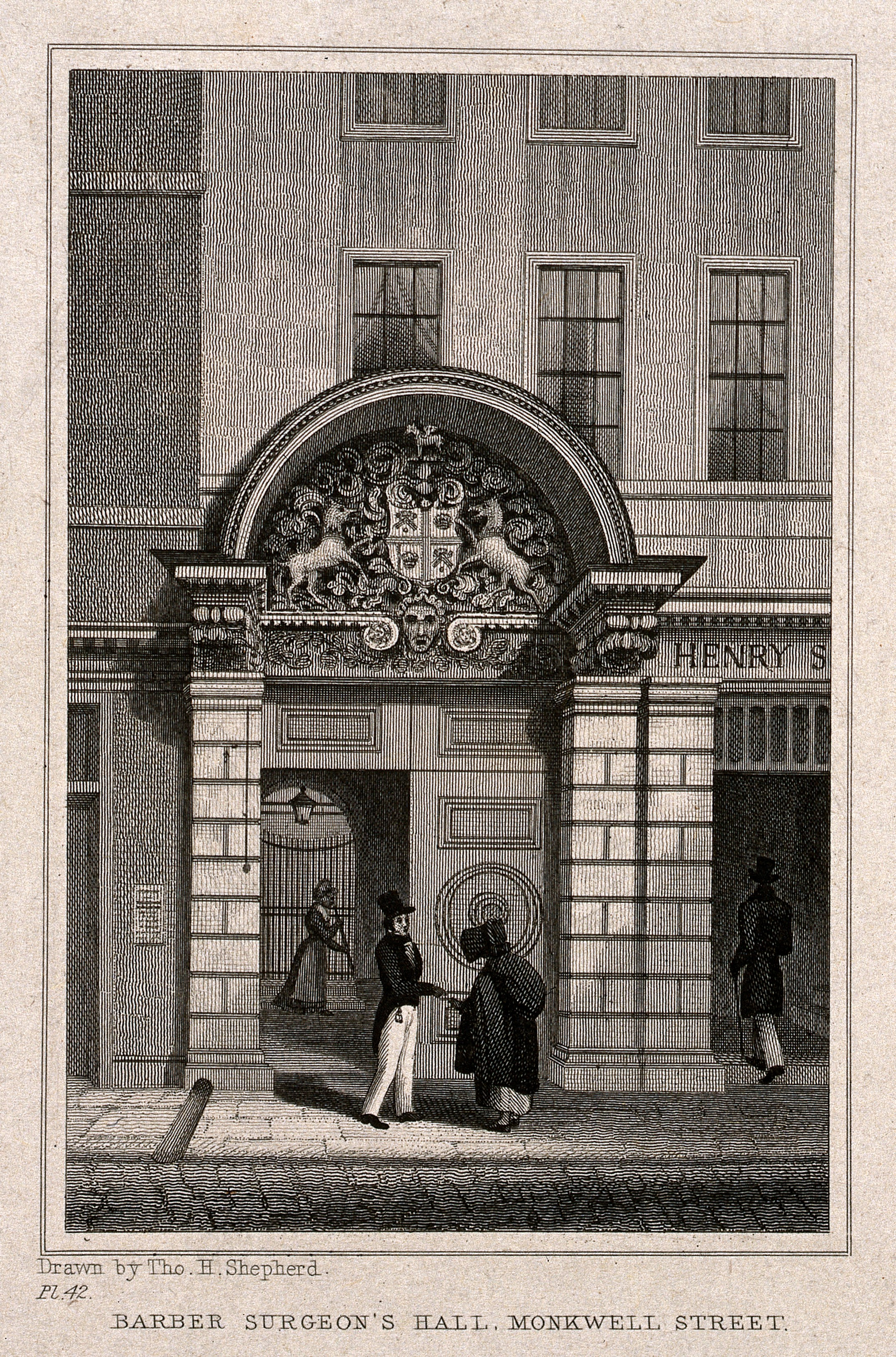
The Barber-Surgeons' Hall on Monkwell Street in 1830

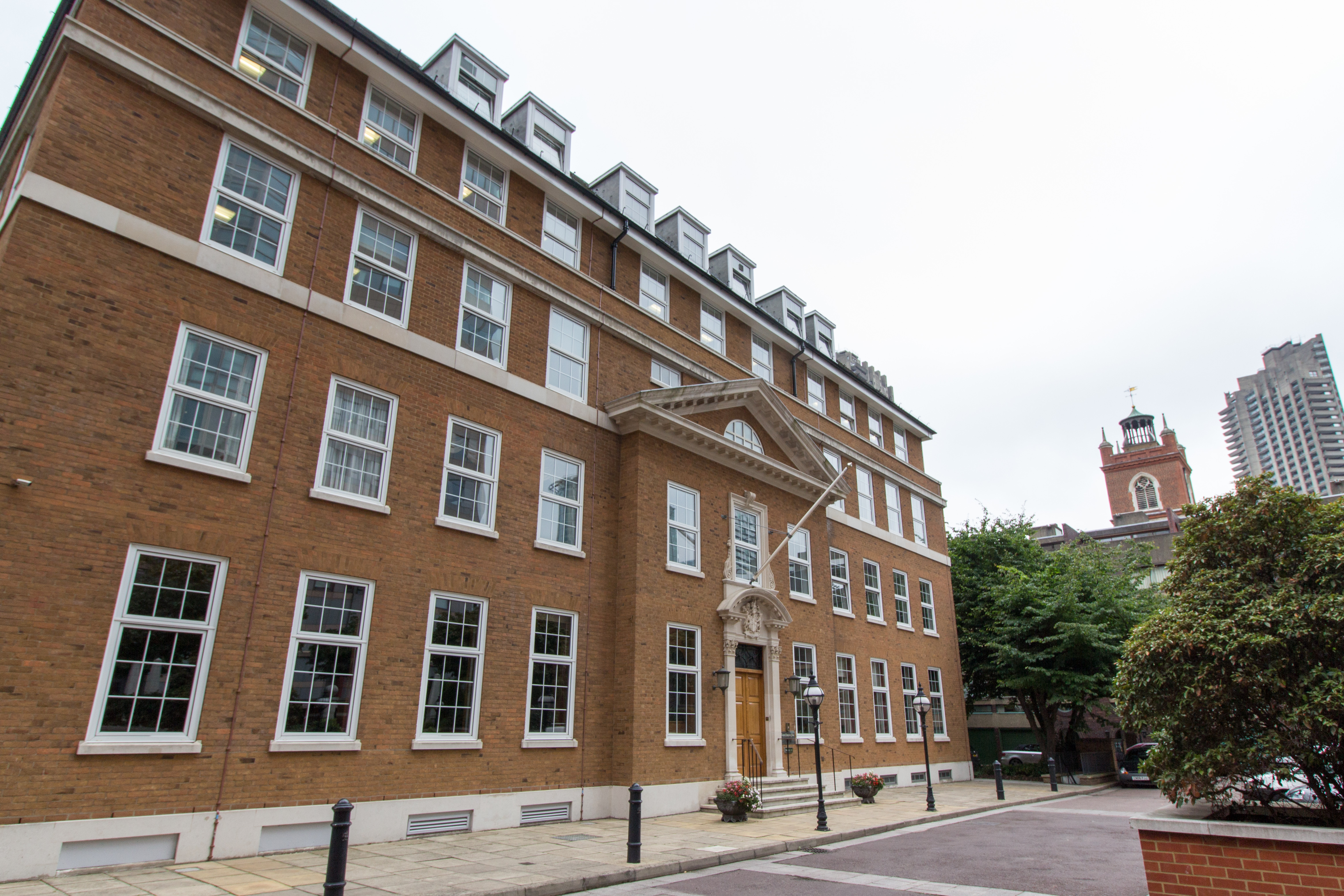
Barber-Surgeons' Hall in Monkwell Square in September 2016

The first mention of the Barbers' Company occurs in 1308 when Richard le Barbour was elected by the Court of Aldermen to keep order amongst his fellows. Barber surgeons originally aided monks, who were at the time the traditional practitioners of medicine and surgery, because papal decrees prohibited members of religious orders themselves from spilling blood. In addition to haircutting, hairdressing, and shaving, barbers performed surgery: neck manipulation; cleansing of ears and scalp; draining/lancing of boils, fistulae, and cysts with wicks; bloodletting and leeching; fire cupping; enemas; and the extraction of teeth.

Soon surgeons with little expertise in the haircutting and shaving arts of the barbers began to join the company, but in 1368, the surgeons were allowed to form their own, unincorporated fellowship or guild. However, the Barbers' Guild retained the power to oversee surgical practices in London. The Barbers' Guild continued this oversight after it became, by royal charter of 1462, a company.

The Fellowship of Surgeons merged with the Barbers' Company in 1540 by Act of Parliament to form the Company of Barbers and Surgeons. The Act specified that no surgeon could cut hair or shave another and that no barber could practice surgery; the only common activity was to be the extraction of teeth. The barber pole, featuring red and white spiralling stripes, indicated the two crafts (surgery in red and barbering in white). Barbers received higher pay than surgeons until surgeons were entered into British warships during naval wars.

In order to become a member of the company, apprentice training would occur for seven years within the household of an experienced barber-surgeon; apprentices would assist in surgical care and gain hands-on experience in tasks such as setting bones and suturing wounds. Once completed, the new member would demonstrate their skills and abilities to Company-appointed examiners. They would then pay a membership fee and join the ranks of the Company.

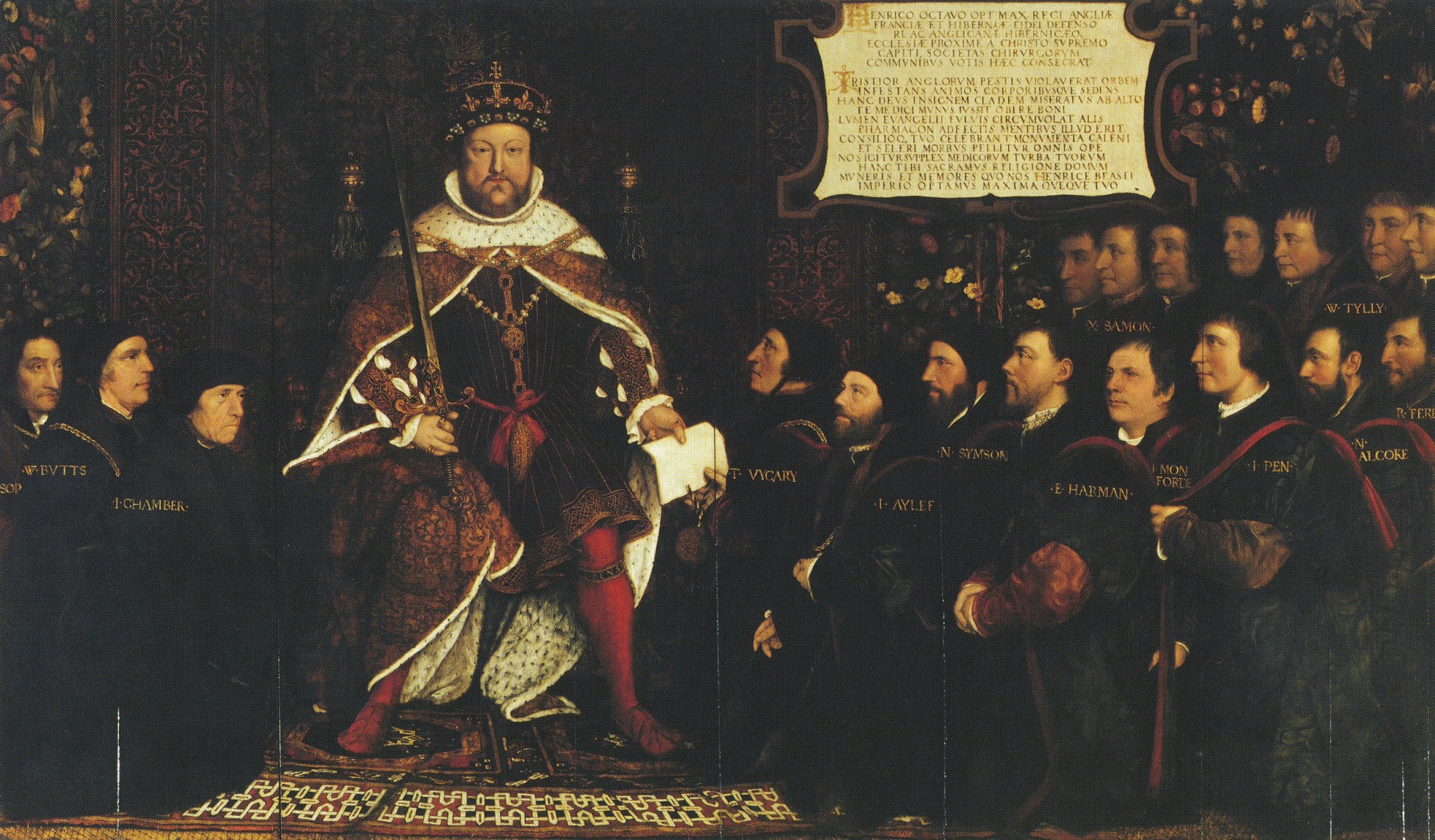
Painting by Hans Holbein the Younger of Henry VIII presenting the Barber-Surgeons' Company Charter to the first Master, Thomas Vicary

The first Master of the Company of Barbers and Surgeons was the superintendent of St Bartholomew's Hospital and royal physician, Thomas Vicary. The presentation of the charter is the subject of a painting by Hans Holbein the Younger, in the collection of the Barbers' Company.

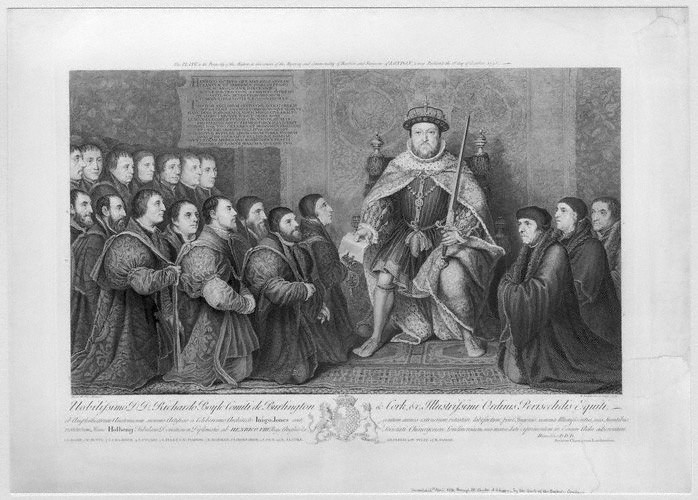
1736 reversed engraving of Hans Holbein 1542 painting of Henry VIII and the Barber Surgeons

However, with the rising professionalism of surgery, in 1745 the surgeons broke away from the barbers to form the Company of Surgeons, which became the Royal College of Surgeons in 1800.

The company no longer retains an association with the hairdressing profession. It does, however, retain its links with surgery, principally acting as a charitable institution to the benefit of medical and surgical cases. In modern times, between one-third and one-half of the company's liverymen are surgeons, dentists or other medical practitioners.

== Barber-Surgeons' Hall and arms ==
The first hall was built on Monkwell Street. The current hall is at Monkwell Square after its predecessor was completely destroyed by bombings during World War II.

After the licensing of dissection in 1540, public demonstrations took place four times a year in the Great Hall of Barber-Surgeons' Hall – with a crowd surrounding a table. Attendance was compulsory for all 'free' surgeons. The dissected corpses were buried in the churchyard of St Olave's, Silver Street. By 1568, the Court of Assistants of the Company ordered wooden raised seating to be erected in the Hall during anatomies. By the 17th century, travelers noted that the universities at Padua and Leiden possessed purpose-built anatomical theatres. Inigo Jones was commissioned to design and build one for the Surgeon-Barbers, but died (1652) before it was finished. The work was completed by John Webb in 1636.

The herb garden that surrounded the Hall was used to create medicinal samples and is considered one of the reasons that people were able to escape during the Great Fire of London in 1666, as it kept the fire away from that side of the building. However, the anatomy theatre was the only Company building to survive the Great Fire of London in 1666.

The second hall was designed by Edward Jarman, whose plan provided a courtyard, with the main part of the Hall on its west side again using bastion 13 of the Roman wall. The buildings remained substantially the same until 1784 when the anatomy theatre was demolished to make way for housing. In 1869, economic constraint necessitated the leasing of the dining hall and kitchen areas for warehouse use, the Company retaining little more than an entrance lobby and Courtroom (which became the new dining hall) on the ground floor, and a staircase leading to a committee room and accommodation for the Beadle.

On the night of 24 August 1940 the second hall and its environs were slightly damaged by a high explosive bomb (the first to fall on London in the Second World War) but on the night of 29 December 1940 the Hall and surrounding area were almost totally destroyed by incendiary bombs which started fires that raged for three days. On 13 May 1969, the current Hall was opened by Queen Elizabeth The Queen Mother.

With the merger of the Barbers' Company and Surgeons' Fellowship in 1540 to become the Company of Barbers and Surgeons, the hall was called Barber-Surgeons' Hall – a name that continues despite the fact that the company is once again the Barbers' Company since the secession of the surgeons.

Current arms of the Worshipful Company of Barbers

Similarly, the arms of the present-day company continue to be those granted in 1569 after the merger: a quartered combination of the arms of the Barbers' Company (granted 1451, with fleams – 1st and 3rd quarters) and the badge of the Fellowship of Surgeons (1492, a crowned rose on a 'spatter' (or spatula) – 2nd and 4th quarters).

- The crest is an opinicus – an English heraldic variation of griffin.
- The supporters are collared (by a crown) and chained lynxes – presumably suggesting the keenness of vision necessary for surgery.
- The motto is De Praescientia Dei (Latin for From/through the Foreknowledge of God) – possibly referring to the uncertain outcomes of the surgeon's attention which, good or bad, were attributed to God.

== Bibliography ==
- Jackson, B. (1 May 2008). "Barber-Surgeons". Journal of Medical Biography. 16 (2): 65. doi:10.1258/jmb.2008.007066. PMID 18463072.
- Young, Sidney (1890). The annals of the barber-surgeons of London. London: Blades, East & Blades.
