= Fleam =

Instrument used for bloodletting

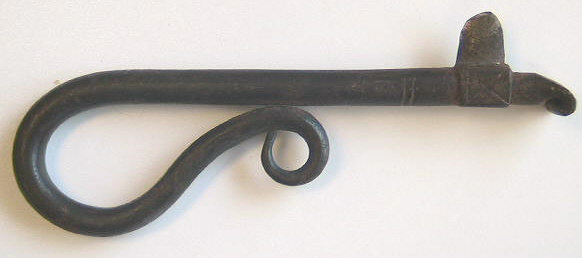
Early iron fleam

A fleam, also bloodletting knife, flem, flew, flue, fleame, phleam or phlebotome, was a handheld instrument used for bloodletting.

== History ==
This name for handheld venipuncture devices first appears in Anglo-Saxon manuscripts around 1000. The name is most likely derived from phlebotome: phlebos, Greek for blood vessel and tome, meaning to cut. These instruments are the progression from the early use of fish teeth, sharpened stones, and thorns used to penetrate blood vessels.

The earliest known examples are made of bronze with a myrtle-leaf shape to the blade. In the 17th and 18th centuries, the German Fliete and French flamettes were developed. These devices with their right-angle blades are the earliest forms of what collectors now refer to as the fleam.

Fleams (in gold) are depicted on the flag of the Royal College of Surgeons in Ireland.

== Use ==
While there are reports of this type of instrument being used in humans, it is more likely that these were reserved for veterinary use, while the common thumb lancet was the instrument of choice for use in people. A survey of 100 fleams found thumb lancets in 6%. These instruments with their triangular-shaped blades were designed to be placed over the vein (most commonly the jugular or saphenous) and struck with a fleam stick. This would ideally result in rapid penetration of the vein with minimal risk to the operator and minimal dissection of the subcutaneous tissues. The latter point was considered important in minimizing the formation of a dissecting hematoma.

Once the desired blood was drained from the patient, the operator would place a pin through the edges of the incision. A figure eight of tail hair or thread was then placed over the pin to retain closure. Statements from Mayhew in his 1864 treatise indicate that the perceived benefits of these procedures were coming into great question in the latter half of the 19th century for all conditions except laminitis.

== Variations ==
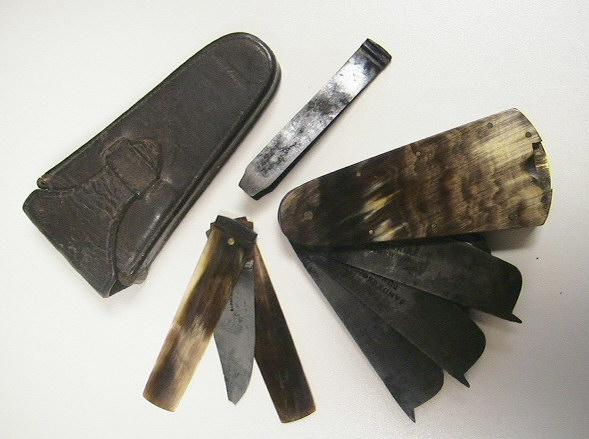
Three blade fleam

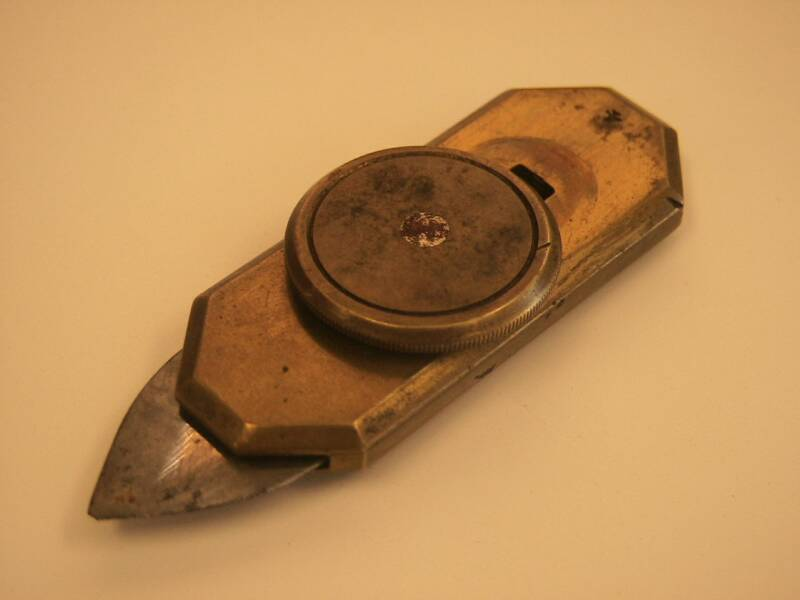
Flat brass fleam by Charriere

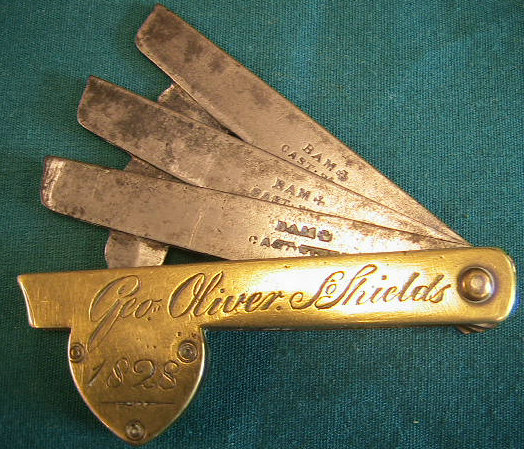
Brass fleam inscribed to George Oliver of South Shields in 1828

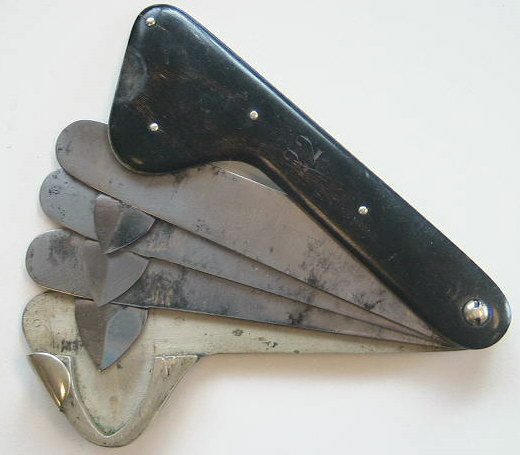
Horn handles fleam with pivoting bolsters for cleaning

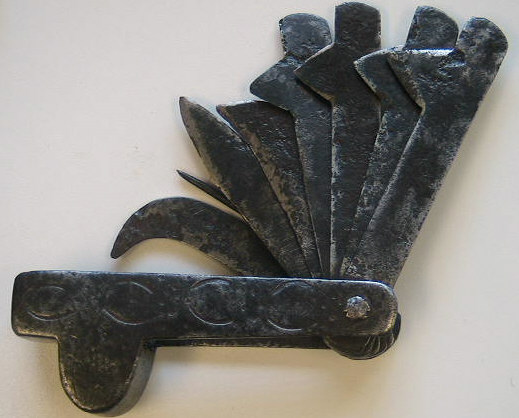
Folding iron fleam with multiple blades

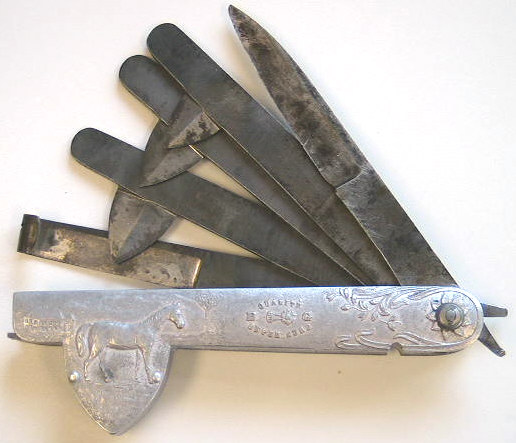
Aluminum fleam with images of horses and cows on the bolster

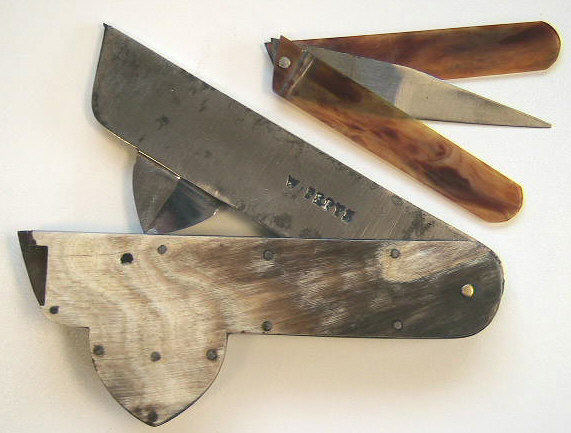
Horn-handled fleam with inset thumb lancet

Early craftsmen often varied the number of blades, the types of materials used for the bolsters, and the types of instruments included in the bolster for patient care. Pictured to the right is a three-blade fleam with a horn handle made in Scotland by the Sanderson craftsmen. This piece has a thumb lancet in one shield of the bolster and a thumb forceps in the other.

Controversy exists among collectors of antique surgical instruments that these types of fleams were made with the lancet so that rural families could bleed the animals and family members alike. Although there are descriptions of the use of thumb lancets in horses for opening the facial vein and for bleeding cats and dogs, the dimensions of the lancets fitted into fleams fit the dimensions of those described by Kirkup for human use.

== See also ==
- Instruments used in general surgery
