= Diego Álvarez Chanca =

Spanish physician (c.1463–c.1515)

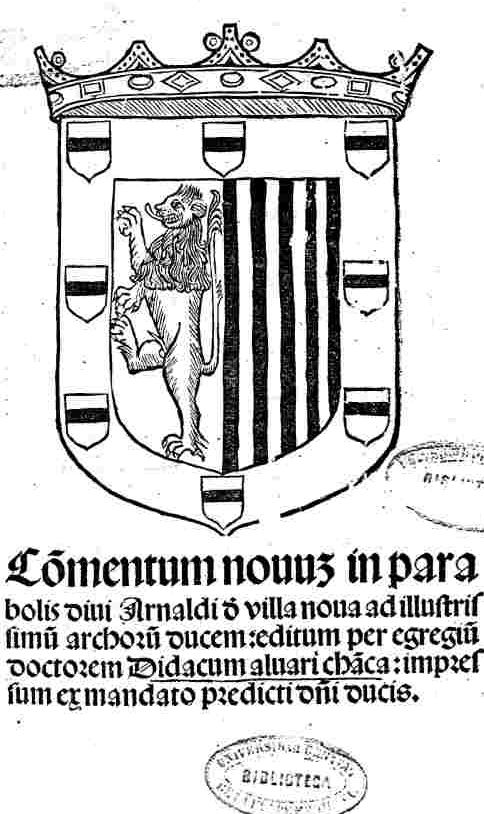
Diego Alvarez Chanca, Commentum novum (1514) title page

Diego Álvarez Chanca (c. 1463 – c. 1515) was a Spanish physician who accompanied Christopher Columbus on his second voyage.

Chanca was a physician-in-ordinary to Ferdinand and Isabella, which is how he was introduced to Columbus. He was appointed by the Crown of Spain to accompany Columbus' second expedition to America in 1493. Shortly after landing on Hispaniola, Columbus suffered from an attack of malarial fever, which Chanca successfully treated. Several other members of the crew were also treated for malaria during this period.

Chanca's opinion was also sought when Columbus was selecting a site for his first settlement, Isabella. While there, Chanca wrote a letter to the municipal council of his native city of Seville entitled Carta del doctor Diego Álvarez Chanca al Cabildo de Sevilla, which was the first document describing the flora, the fauna, the ethnology, and the ethnography of America.

After his return to Spain in February 1494, he published in 1506 a medical treatise entitled Para curar el mal de Costado (The Treatment of Pleurisy), and in 1514, he published a work in Latin criticizing a book entitled De conservanda juventute et retardanda senectute, the work of Arnaldo de Villanova, a brother-physician.

He is also credited with introducing chili peppers (pimientos) and allspice to Spanish cuisine, both of which he described for the first time in Europe in 1494 in his letter to the Council of Seville.

== Bibliography ==
- Fuentes, Ventura (1908). "Diego Alvarez Chanca". The Catholic Encyclopedia. Robert Appleton Company.
- Olson, Julius E., ed. (1906). "Letter of Dr. Chanca on the Second Voyage of Columbus". The Northmen, Columbus and Cabot, 985-1503. Charles Scribner's Sons.
- Ruiz, Teofilo F. (1992). "Chanca, Diego Alvarez". The Christopher Columbus Encyclopedia. Simon & Schuster.
