= Antoni de Gimbernat =

Spanish surgeon and anatomist (1734–1816)

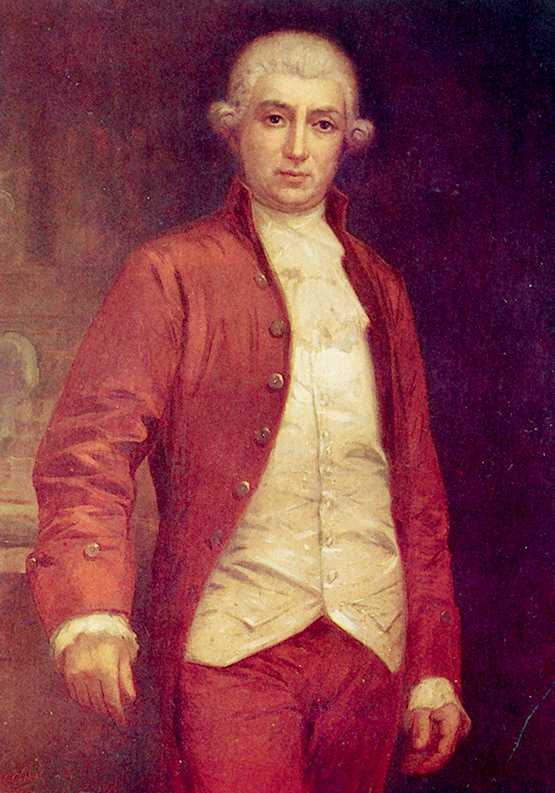
Antonio de Gimbernat

Don Antonio de Gimbernat y Arbós (1734–1816) was a Spanish surgeon and anatomist. He is known for laying the groundwork for modern techniques of inguinal hernia repair. He also described in detail the anatomy of the inguinal and femoral regions of the human body.

The lacunar ligament is named after Antonio de Gimbernat.

Gimbernat was born in Cambrils, (Tarragona), and died in Madrid. His son Don Antonio Gimbernat FRSE (1765-1834) closely followed in his footsteps and was First Surgeon to the King of Spain.

== Bibliography ==
- Antoni Gimbernat i Arbós | Galeria de Metges Catalans In Catalan.
