= Transmission chain method =

Method in social psychology

In social psychology, a transmission chain is when information is passed between people sequentially, each person in the chain usually modifying the information they were given. This is similar to the telephone game (known as Chinese whispers in some countries). The transmission chain method is a method used in cultural evolution research to uncover biases in cultural transmission. This method was first developed by Frederic Bartlett in 1932.

== Application in studies of memory ==
The transmission chain method is used to reveal what elements of a story the participants are most likely to remember, as well as how they transform the elements of the story. Bartlett's book, Remembering, describes a series of studies of transmission of various material, from Native American folk tales to descriptions of sporting events. From these he made two major inferences, corroborated by later studies: loss of the detail and dependence of the quality of remembering on the pre-existing knowledge. From these he inferred that remembering is a process of reconstruction of information, rather than of replication.

== See also ==
- Isnad, the transmission chain of narrators to authenticate a hadith
- Euhemerism
