= Donlevy =

Donlevy, Dunlevy, Donleavy and Dunleavy are Irish surnames derived from the Gaelic Mac Duinnshléibhe/Ó Duinnshléibhe 'son/descendant of Donn Sléibhe'; a given name meaning 'Donn of the mountain', i.e. 'dark mountain'. The MacDonlevys were the hereditary rulers of Dál Fiatach and styled as the Kings of Ulaid, i.e. rulers of (east) Ulster, in present-day County Down.

== History ==
=== Ancestry ===
The family's eponymous ancestor is Donn Sléibe mac Echdacha, who ruled as king of the Irish petty-kingdom of Dál Fiatach, as well as its over-kingdom, Ulaid, in the late 10th century.

=== History ===
The power-base of the MacDonlevys was Dál Fiatach, a territory which spanned south from the Mourne Mountains north to the River Lagan; at times they exerted control over the entirety of Ulaid (eastern Ulster; present-day counties Down and Antrim). According to historian C. Thomas Cairney, MacDonlevys were the chiefly family of the Ulaid who were a tribe of the Erainn who were the second wave of Celts to settle in Ireland between about 500 and 100 BC.

In the aftermath of John de Courcy's conquest of Ulaid in 1177, MacDonlevy's power was vanquished. As a result, the last-remaining members of the clan migrated to Tír Conaill (present-day County Donegal), whilst others went to Scotland. In Donegal, they became the hereditary physicians (Irish: ollamh leighis) of the O'Donnells of Tír Conaill. Indeed, since 1177, the MacDonlevys became renowned as a medical family and were among the foremost Irish medical families, employed across Gaelic Ireland and the Scottish Highlands and Isles.

After the Battle of Kinsale in 1602, the sept migrated to the province of Connacht, where their name is now most common. Some of the clan in Donegal adopted the surname Mac an Ultaigh, meaning "son of the Ulsterman", which was anglicized as McNulty.

== Notable people ==
=== Donlevy ===
- Andrew Donlevy (born 1694), Irish Roman Catholic priest
- Brian Donlevy (1889–1972), American actor
- Frank Donlevy (1932–1982), Scottish footballer
- Jim Donlevy (1937–2019), Canadian football coach

=== Donleavy ===
- J. P. Donleavy (1926–2017), American writer
- Lia Donleavy (born 2007), Canadian Dancer

=== Dunleavy ===
- Chris Dunleavy (born 1949), English footballer
- Dan Dunleavy (born 1965), Canadian sportscaster
- Jack Dunleavy (1879–1944), American baseball player
- John Dunleavy (born 1991), Irish footballer
- Mary Dunleavy (born 1966), American opera singer
- Mike Dunleavy Sr. (born 1954), American basketball player and coach
  - Mike Dunleavy Jr. (born 1980), older son, player
  - Baker Dunleavy (born 1982), younger son, coach
- Mike J. Dunleavy (born 1961), American politician
- Patrick Dunleavy (born 1952), British political scientist
- Philip Dunleavy (1915–1996), Welsh politician
- Richard Dunleavy (born 1933), American naval officer
- Rosemary Dunleavy, American ballerina
- Steve Dunleavy (1938–2019), Australian journalist

=== Dunlevy ===
- Katie-George Dunlevy (born 1981), English-born para-cyclist
- Mairéad Dunlevy (1941–2008), Irish museum curator and costume expert
- Mike Dunlevy (born c. 1965), American college football coach
- Pearl Dunlevy (1909–2002), Irish physician and epidemiologist

=== Mac Duinnshléibhe ===
- Cormac Mac Duinnshléibhe, fifteenth-century Irish physician and scribe
- Suibhne mac Duinnshléibhe, thirteenth-century Scottish magnate

=== Ó Duinnshléibhe ===
- Donnchadh mac Eoghan Ó Duinnshléibhe, Irish physician, d. 1528
- Muiris mac Donnchadh Ulltach Ó Duinnshléibhe, Irish cleric, fl. 1602–1630s
- Muiris mac Seaán Ulltach Ó Duinnshléibhe, Irish cleric, fl. 1602–1630s

== List of Mac Duinn Sléibe kings of Ulaid ==
- Donn Sléibe mac Eochada 1081–1091, the eponymous ancestor of the Mac Duinn Sléibe dynasty.
- Donnchad mac Duinn Sléibe 1091–1095
- Eochaid mac Duinn Sléibe 1095–1099
- Donnchad mac Duinn Sléibe 1099–1099
- Eochaid mac Duinn Sléibe 1099–1108
- Donnchad mac Duinn Sléibe 1108–1113
- Áed mac Duinn Sléibe 1113–1127
- Cú Ulad mac Conchobair Chisenaig Mac Duinn Sléibe 1131–1157
- Áed mac Con Ulad Mac Duinn Sléibe 1157–1158
- Eochaid mac Con Ulad Mac Duinn Sléibe 1158–1166
- Magnus mac Con Ulad Mac Duinn Sléibe 1166–1171
- Donn Sléibe mac Con Ulad Mac Duinn Sléibe 1171–1172
- Ruaidrí mac Con Ulad Mac Duinn Sléibe 1172–1201
- Cu-Ulahd Mac Duinn Sléibe (fl. c. 1178)

== List of physicians ==
- Muiris MacDonlevy (died 1395) is the first member entered in the Irish Annals where they are listed as ollahm lieghis chenel Conaill, the physician to the Cenel Conaill, the ruling dynasty of Tír Conaill.
- By his agnomens Paul Ultach or Paul the Ulidian, Muiris's father is also mentioned at this 1395 A.D. entry to be a physician who flourished both before and after Muiris.
- Cormac MacDonlevy (fl. c. 1460) was an influential medieval Irish physician and medical scholar, who advanced Irish medieval medical practice by, for the first time, translating seminal continental European medical texts from Latin to the vernacular. His translations provided the then-exclusively Gaelic language-speaking majority of Irish physicians with their first reference access to these texts.
- Murtough Ultaigh Donlevy is recorded as being a physician under an entry for 1497.
- Donnell Ultaigh Donlevy, the son of an unnamed Ultaigh "ollav" to the O’Donnell in Tir Chonaill, is recorded as having been slain in the year 1567.
- Donnchadh mac Eoghan Ó Duinnshléibhe (Donnchadh MacDonlevy, died 1527) is recorded as a physician.
- Owen Ultach (died 1586) was the son of Donnchadh. Considered throughout Ireland and much of Europe as the finest physician of his time, with his skills not only recounted by the Irish Annals and at the Dictionary of National Biography but also by Stanihurst.
- "Dyonisius Ultanus", the son of an Irish doctor, is referenced by Tyrconnell-born physician Niall Ó Glacáin as a patient he treated in Valencia.

The Annals note further that the branch of the MacDonlevy, who had been the physicians, still existed near Kilmacrenan, County Donegal in the early 17th century.

== See also ==
- McNulty
- Irish clans

== Bibliography ==
- Bell, Robert (2003). The Book of Ulster Surnames. The Blackstaff Press. ISBN 978-0-85640-602-7.
- Keating, Geoffrey (1983). Keating's History of Ireland. Irish Genealogical Foundation. ISBN 978-0-686-44360-5.
- Hack, G.H. (1901). Genealogical History of the Donlevy Family Columbus, Ohio. Chaucer Press, Evans Printing Co.
- T. Moody; F. Mortin; F. Byrne (1993). A New History of Modern Ireland (Early modern Ireland 1534–1691). Oxford University Press.
