= Owen Ultach =

Sixteenth-century Irish physician

Owen Ultach (Irish: Eoghan Ulltach; died 26 October 1586) was a sixteenth-century Irish physician. He was the ollam leighis (official physician) to the O’Donnell clan of Tyrconnell.

== Background ==
Ultach was born in the sixteenth century to the Ó Duinnshléibhe family. Formerly the ruling dynasty of Ulaid, by the late-fourteenth century, they were a medical family of physicians to the O'Donnell clan. Certain family members went by the alternate surname Ultach, after Ulaid.

His father Donnchadh was the ollam leighis before him. Ultach may have been named after his paternal grandfather, Owen.

Ultach was, like his father, educated in the medical arts in Paris and known for his general learning. He was considered the finest physician of his time in Ireland.

== Death ==
Owen Ultach died on 26 October, 1586. His obituaries in the Annals of the Four Masters and the Annals of Ulster read, respectively:

- 1586 - Owen Ultach (the son of Donough), i.e. the Doctor, died; and this Owen was a doctor in regard of learning, for he excelled the medical doctors of Ireland in the time in which he lived.
- 1586 - The 26th day of the month of October, Eoghan Ulltach, son of the doctor, namely, Donchadh, son of Eoghan, unique preceptor and unique sage of Ireland in healing, died this year.

Ultach is the last recorded ollam leighis to the O'Donnell clan. By the early 1600s, Tyrconnell-born Niall Ó Glacáin was working as a physician to the clan.

== See also ==
- Irish medical families
- Donnchadh mac Eoghan Ó Duinnshléibhe, Irish physician, died 1527
- Muiris mac Donnchadh Ulltach Ó Duinnshléibhe, Irish cleric, fl. 1602-1630s
- Muiris mac Seaán Ulltach Ó Duinnshléibhe, Irish cleric, fl. 1602-1630s.
- Cormac Mac Duinnshléibhe, Irish physician and scribe, fl. c. 1460
