= Donnchadh mac Eoghan Ó Duinnshléibhe =

Irish doctor (d. 1527)

Donnchadh mac Eoghan Ó Duinnshléibhe, anglicised as Donough MacOwen O'Donlevy (died 30 September 1527) was an Irish physician. He was the ollam leighis (official physician) of the O'Donnell dynasty from at least 1497 to 1527.

== Background ==
Born in the fifteenth century to a father named Owen, Ó Duinnshléibhe became known for his wealth.

The Ó Duinnshléibhe family were formerly the ruling dynasty of the over-kingdom of Ulaid. By the mid-fifteenth century, they were a hereditary medical family of physicians to the O'Donnells, based in Tyrconnell. Some members of the family went by the surname Ultach, named after Ulaid.

In 1497, Con O'Donnell (son of Chief Hugh Roe O'Donnell) was defeated in battle by Teige Mac Dermot of Moylurg. As the O'Donnell's physician, Ó Duinnshléibhe was taken prisoner by Mac Dermot.

== Death and legacy ==
The Annals of the Four Masters contains Ó Duinnshléibhe's obituary:

- 1527 - The physician O'Donlevy (Donough, son of Owen), a Doctor of Medicine, and learned in other sciences, a man of great affluence and wealth, who kept a house of general hospitality, died on the 30th of September.

Ó Duinnshléibhe had a son, Owen Ultach, who succeeded him as the O'Donnell's ollam leighis.

== See also ==
- Irish medical families
- Owen Ultach, his son, Irish physician, died 1586
- Muiris mac Donnchadh Ulltach Ó Duinnshléibhe, Irish cleric, fl. 1602-1630s
- Muiris mac Seaán Ulltach Ó Duinnshléibhe, Irish cleric, fl. 1602-1630s.
- Cormac Mac Duinnshléibhe, Irish physician and scribe, fl. c. 1460
- Niall Ó Glacáin, physician to the O'Donnells in the early seventeenth century
