= Lanfranc (disambiguation) =

Lanfranc (c. 1005–1089) was an Archbishop of Canterbury. Lanfranc may also refer to:

- Lanfranc Cigala (fl. 1235–1257), Genoese nobleman, judge, and man of letters
- Lanfranc of Milan (c.1250-1306), surgeon
- Lanfranc I of Bergamo (c. 895–950), northern Italian nobleman
- HMHS Lanfranc, a British First World War hospital ship
- The Archbishop Lanfranc Academy, secondary school in Croydon, UK
  - 1961 Holtaheia Vickers Viking crash, redirect from Lanfranc School air accident.

== See also ==
- Lanfranco (disambiguation)
