= Chaulhac =

- Commune
- Location of Chaulhac
- Location within France Location within Occitanie
- Coordinates: 44°55′23″N 3°15′26″E
- Country: France
- Region: Occitania
- Department: Lozère
- Arrondissement: Mende
- Canton: Saint-Alban-sur-Limagnole
- Intercommunality: Terres d'Apcher-Margeride-Aubrac

Government
  - Mayor (2020–2026): Gérard Rousset
- Area^{1}: 9.47 km^{2} (3.66 sq mi)
- Elevation: 916 m (3,005 ft)
- Highest elevation: 1,024 m (3,360 ft)
- Lowest elevation: 740 m (2,430 ft)
- Population (2023): 58
  - Density: 6.1/km^{2} (16/sq mi)
- Time zone: UTC+01:00 (CET)
  - Summer (DST): UTC+02:00 (CEST)
- INSEE/Postal code: 48046 /48140
- ^{1} French Land Register data, which excludes lakes, ponds, glaciers > 1 km^{2} (0.386 sq mi or 247 acres) and river estuaries.

Chaulhac is a commune in the Lozère department in southern France.

== Notable people ==
Guy de Chauliac, a physician, was born here around 1300. He is known for his lengthy and influential treatise on surgery in Latin, titled "Chirurgia Magna." He was the personal physician and surgeon to Pope Clement VI (1342–1352), Pope Innocent VI (1352–1362), and Pope Urban V (1362–1370).)

== See also ==
- Communes of the Lozère department
