= William of Saliceto =

Italian anatomist (1210–1277)

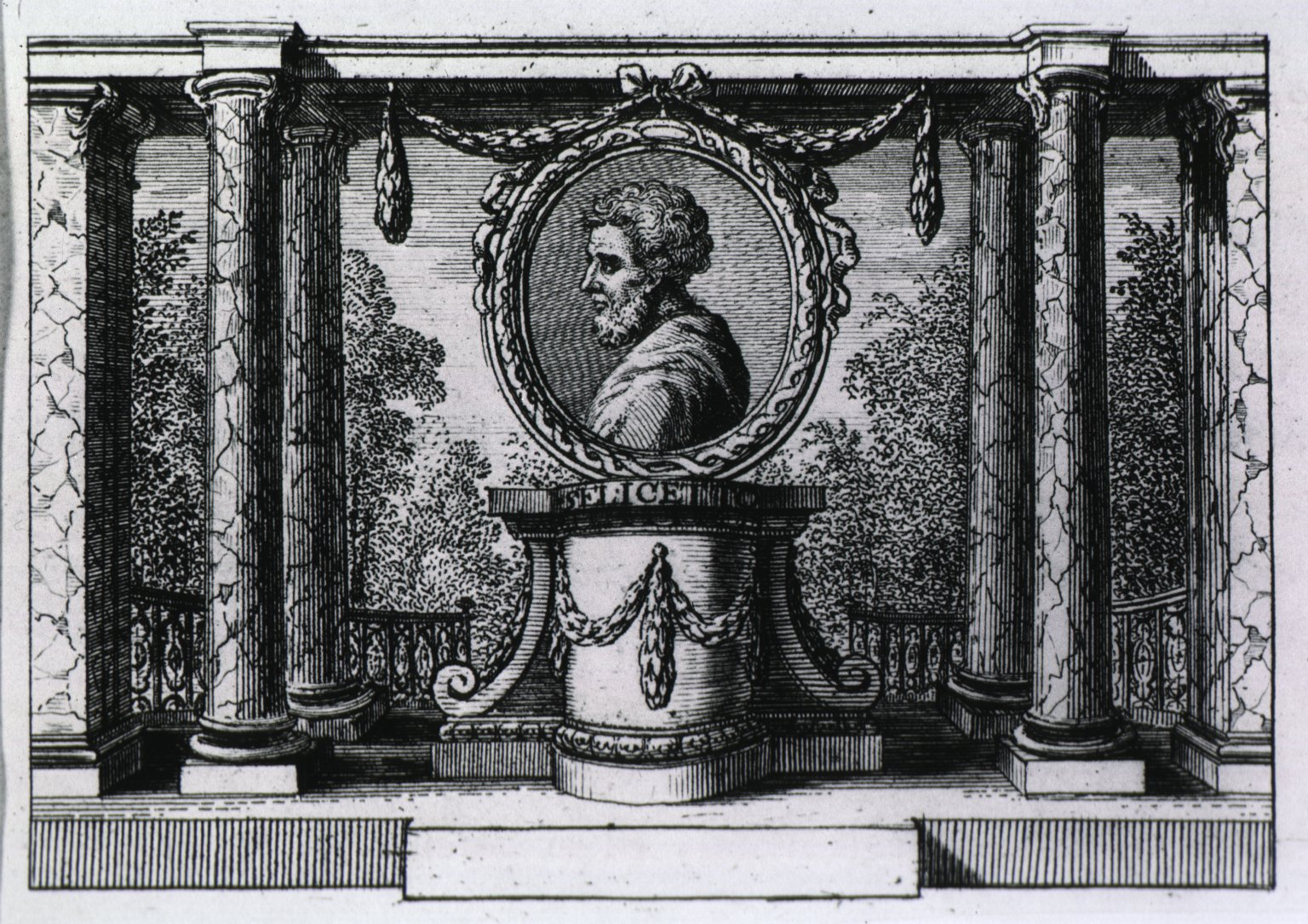
William of Salicet

William of Saliceto (1210–1277) (Italian: Guglielmo da Saliceto; French: Guillaume de Salicet; Latin: Guilielmus de Salicetum) was an Italian surgeon and cleric in Saliceto.

He broke tradition with Galen by claiming that pus formation was bad for wounds and for the patient. He was a professor at the University of Bologna. In 1275 he wrote Chirurgia which promoted the use of a surgical knife over cauterizing. He also was the author of Summa conservationis et curationis on hygiene and therapy. Lanfranc of Milan was a pupil who brought William's methods into France. William gave lectures on the importance of regular bathing for infants, and special care for the hygiene of pregnant women.
