= Bernard de Gordon =

French doctor and professor of medicine

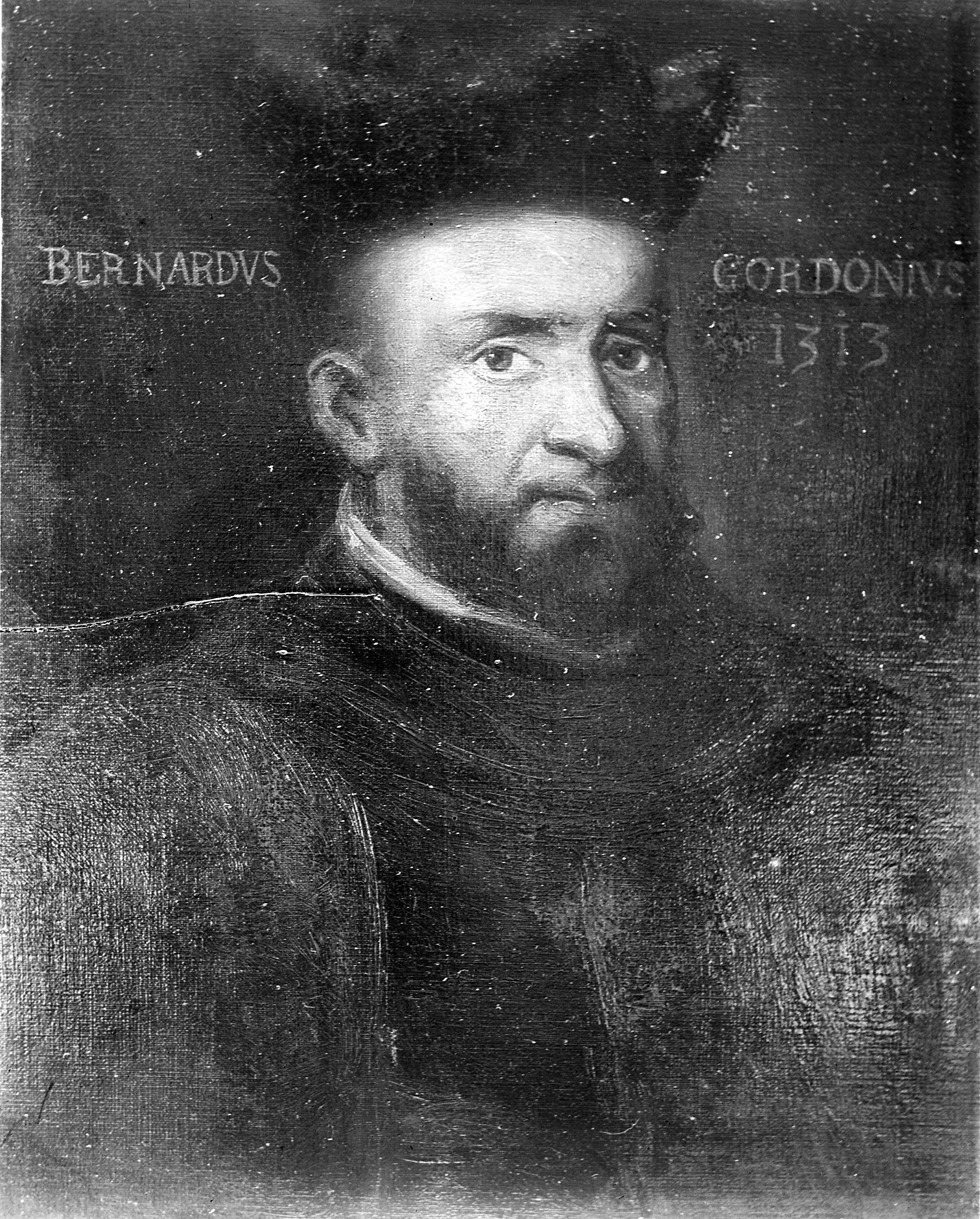
Portrait of Bernard de Gordon

Bernard de Gordon (Latin: Bernardus Gordonensis; fl. 1270 - 1330) was a French medical doctor and professor of medicine at the University of Montpellier from 1285. In 1296 he wrote the therapeutic work, De decem ingeniis seu indicationibus curandorum morborum. His most important work was the Lilium medicinae, printed in Naples in 1480, Lyon in 1491, and Venice in 1494. It describes plague, tuberculosis, scabies, epilepsy, anthrax, and leprosy. In the 15th century, it was translated into Irish by physician and scribe Cormac Mac Duinnshléibhe.

== Works ==
- De regimine acutorum morborum, 1294.
- Liber pronosticorum/Tractatus de crisi et de diebus creticis, 1295.
- De Decem Ingeniis curandorum morborum, 1299.
- Liber de conservatione vitae humanae, 1308.
- Practica seu Lilium medicinae, 1303.

== Bibliography ==
- Karl Sudhoff, "Zur Schriftstellerei Bernhards von Gordon und deren zeitlicher Folge. Eine Handschriftenstudie". In: Archiv für Geschichte der Medizin. Band 10, 1917, S. 162–188.
- Guardo, Alberto Alonso. Los pronósticos médicos en la Medicina Medieval: El Tractatus de crisi et de diebus creticis de Bernardo de Gordonio. Valladolid: Secretariado de Publicaciones e Intercambio Científico Univ. de Valladolid, 2003. ISBN 84-8448-233-2
- Guardo, Alberto Alonso. "El Lilium medicine y el Tractatus de crisi et de diebus creticis de Bernardo de Gordonio. Estudio comparativo." In Noua et uetera: Nuevos horizontes de la Filología latina, vol. 1, edited by A. Mª Aldama, Mª F. del Barrio and A. Espigares, 435–443. Madrid: Sociedad de Estudios Latinos, 2002.
- Conde Parrado, P., E. Montero Cartelle and MC. Herrero Inglemo, eds. Bernard de Gordon : Tractatus de conceptu / Tractatus de sterilitate mulierum. Valladolid: Editorial Univ. de Valladolid, 1999. Latin edition and Spanish translation.
- Cull, John, and Brian Dutton, eds. Lilio de medicina: un manual basico de medicine medieval. Madison: Hispanic seminary of medieval studies, 1991.
- Demaitre, Luke. Doctor Bernard de Gordon. Professor and Practitioner. Toronto: University of Toronto, 1980. ISBN 0-88844-051-0.
- Demaitre, Luke. "Bernard de Gordon et son influence sur la pensée médicale aux XIVe et XVe siècles." In L'Université de Montpellier et son rayonnement (XIIIe -- XVe siècles): Actes du Colloque international de Montpellier III (17-19 mai 2001), edited by D. Le Blévec, 103–31. Turnhout: Brepols, 2004.
- Dutton, Brian, and Maria Nieves Sanchez. Bernard de Gordonio : Lilio de medicina. Madrid: Arco/libros, 1993.
- Grmek, Mirko D., ed. Histoire de la pensée médicale en Occident, tome 1 : antiquité et Moyen Âge. Paris: Le Seuil, 1995.
- Wickersheimer, Ernest. Dictionnaire biographique des médecins en France au Moyen Age. Genève: Librairie Droz, 1979.
- Pearn, John (2013-02-01). "Bernard de Gordon (f1. 1270–1330): medieval physician and teacher". Journal of Medical Biography. 21 (1): 8–11. doi:10.1258/jmb.2011.011026. ISSN 0967-7720.
