= San Lorenzo in Lucina =

Roman Catholic basilica in Rome, Italy

Basilica of St. Lawrence in Lucina
- Basilica S. Laurentii in Lucina (in Latin)
- Basilica di San Lorenzo in Lucina
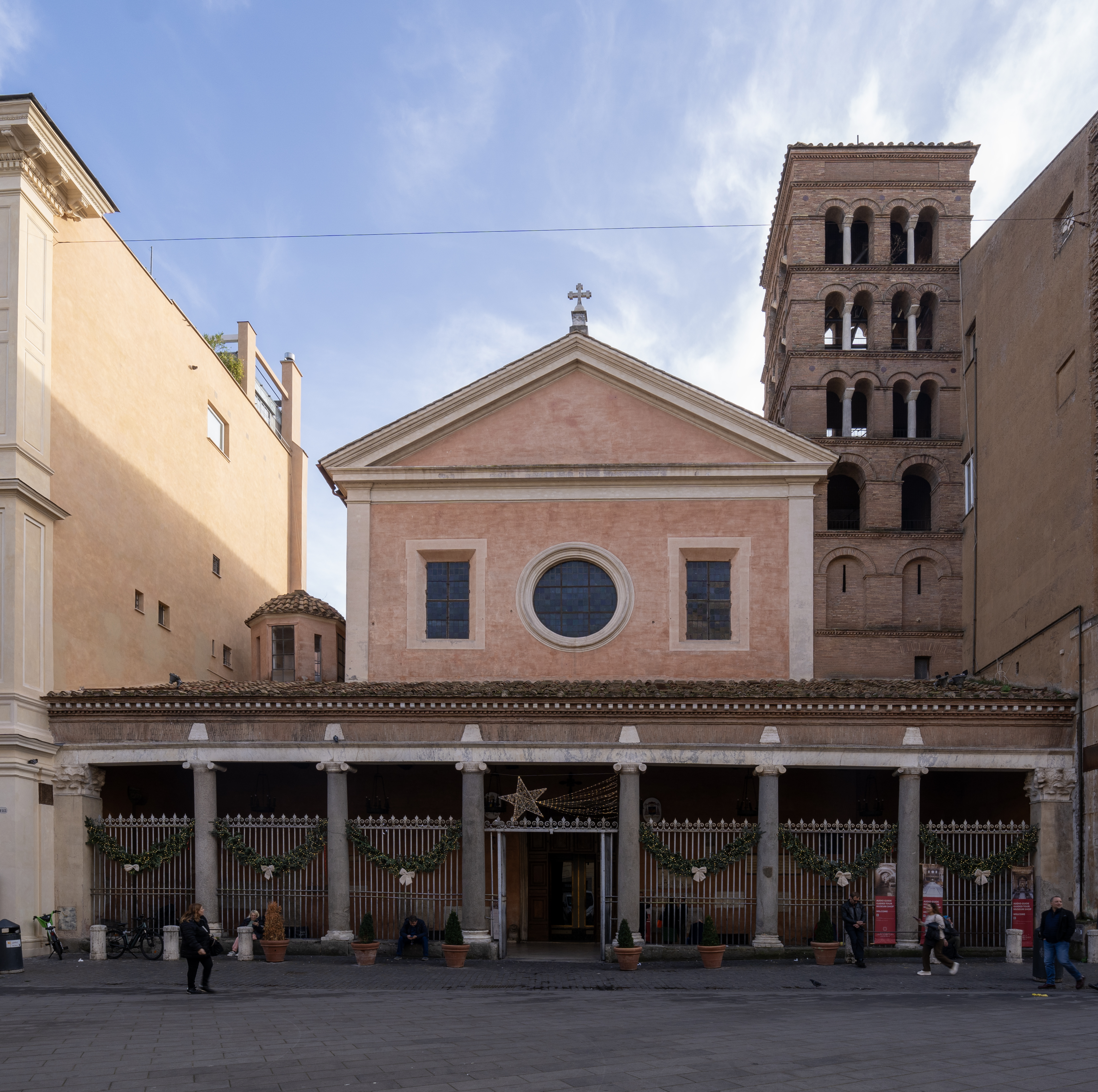
- Façade of San Lorenzo in Lucina in 2023.
- Click on the map for a fullscreen view
- 41°54′12.3″N 12°28′43.3″E
- Location: Rome
- Country: Italy
- Denomination: Roman Catholic

History
- Status: Parish church, titular church, minor basilica

Architecture
- Architectural type: Church
- Groundbreaking: AD 4th century

Specifications
- Length: 65 metres (213 ft)
- Width: 16 metres (52 ft)

The Minor Basilica of St. Lawrence in Lucina (Italian: Basilica Minore di San Lorenzo in Lucina or simply Italian: San Lorenzo in Lucina; Latin: S. Laurentii in Lucina) is a Roman Catholic parish, titular church, and minor basilica in central Rome, Italy. The basilica is located in Piazza di San Lorenzo in Lucina in the Rione Colonna, about two blocks behind the Palazzo Montecitorio, proximate to the Via del Corso.

== History ==
The basilica is dedicated to St. Lawrence of Rome, deacon and martyr. The name "Lucina" derives from that of the Roman matron of the AD 4th century who permitted Christians to erect a church on the site. Pope Marcellus I supposedly hid on the site during the persecutions of Roman Emperor Maxentius, and Pope Damasus I was elected there in AD 366.

The consecration of a basilica dedicated to St Lawrence by Pope Sixtus III, who was Pope from AD 432 to AD 440 is mentioned in the Liber Pontificalis. Translator of the text, Louise Loomis, states that this basilica is the San Lorenzo fuori le Mura but notes that Arthur Frothingham believes it to be the church of San Lorenzo in Lucina. Frothingham makes note of Titulus Lucinae in a list of parish churches in Rome.

In the preserved decrees of a synod held in AD 499 by Pope Symmachus, the denomination of a church as Titulus Lucinae is mentioned, which was the dedicated to St Lawrence, according to the translators of the manuscript.

A basilica dedicated to St Lawrence is also mentioned under the Liber Pontificalis,

The church was first reconstructed by Pope Paschal II in the early 12th century.

The church was consecrated by Pope Celestine III on 26 May 1196.

In 1606 Pope Paul V assigned the basilica to the order of Clerics Regular Minor. Cosimo Fanzago completely renovated the interior in the 17th century, including conversion of the side aisles of the basilica into chapels. The ceiling was also frescoed by the Neapolitan Mometto Greuter.

In the 19th century, in a subsequent restoration of the interior commissioned by Pope Pius IX, the Baroque decoration of the nave was replaced with frescoes painted by Roberto Bompiani.

The current Cardinal Priest of the Titulus S. Laurentii in Lucina is Malcolm Ranjith Patabendige Don, Archbishop of Colombo, Sri Lanka, who was appointed on 20 November 2010.

== Art and architecture ==
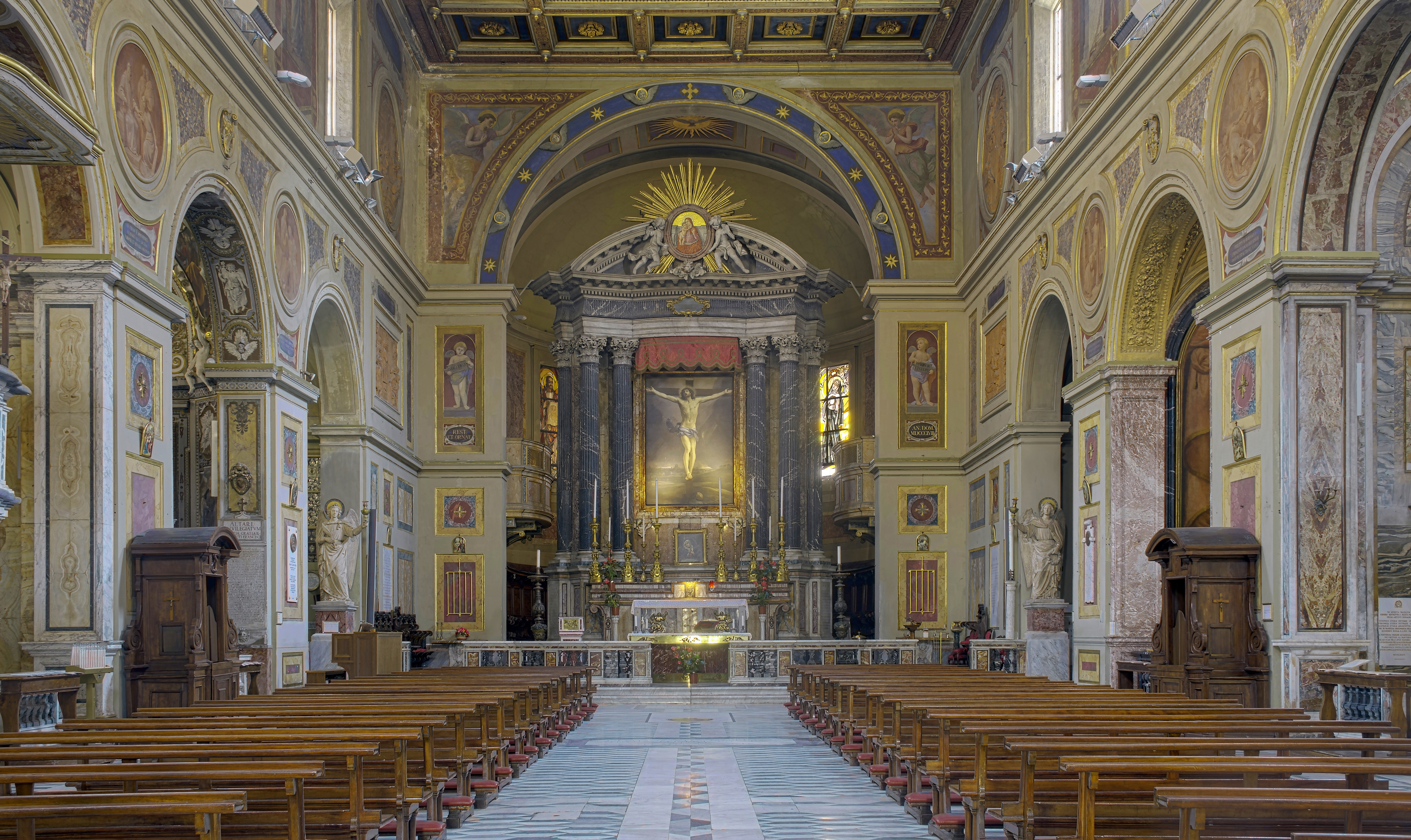
Interior

In the rebuilding of 1650, the aisled basilical plan was destroyed and the lateral naves were replaced by Baroque chapels, which were then leased to noble families to decorate and use as mausolea. This was done by inserting walls behind the piers of the arcades. The arcades themselves have solid, square piers with imposts. The flat ceiling is coffered, gilded, and decorated with rosettes and has a painting of the Apotheosis of St. Lawrence in the central panel. This ceiling was made in 1857 under Pope Pius IX.

Guido Reni's Christ on the Cross (1639–40) is visible above the high altar, framed by six Corinthian columns of black marble. Below the altar is a reliquary in which is preserved the gridiron on which tradition maintains that St. Lawrence was martyred. The marble throne of Pope Paschal II in the apse behind the high altar has an inscription that records the translation to the basilica of its relics of St. Lawrence of Rome. A Madonna and Child with John of Nepomuk and Archangel Michael by Onofrio Avellino hangs in the apse behind the high altar.

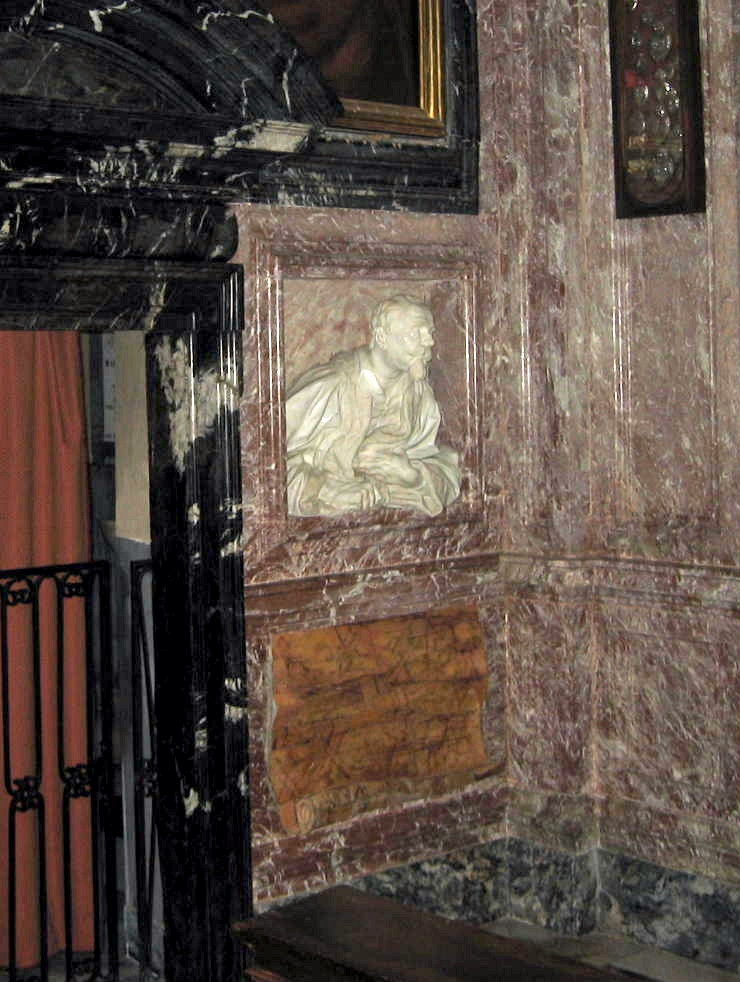
Bust of Gabriel Fonseca by Gian Lorenzo Bernini

Gian Lorenzo Bernini designed the Cappella Fonseca, fourth on the right, for the Portuguese Gabriele Fonseca, who was physician to Pope Innocent X (1644–55). The chapel has some fine busts by Bernini and his workshop, including a portrait of Fonseca to the left of the altar. This chapel also has the painting Elisha Pouring Salt into the Bitter Fountain by Giacinto Gimignani of 1664.

The French artist Nicolas Poussin (1594–1665) is buried in the second chapel on the right side and is commemorated with a monument that the French Ambassador François-René de Chateaubriand donated in 1830.

The second chapel on the left has an altarpiece by Carlo Saraceni.

The fifth chapel on the left was designed and decorated by Simon Vouet. His two paintings depict St. Francis of Assisi: one shows him receiving his religious habit and the other depicts his temptations. The altarpiece shows St. Francis Appearing to Giacinta Marescotti on Her Deathbed by Marco Benefial.

Giuseppe Sardi designed the baptistery to the left of the entrance in the 17th century.

In the basilica is also the tomb of the composer Bernardo Pasquini (1637–1710). Three years after the composer's death, his portrait was placed there, sculpted in Carrara marble by Pietro Francesco Papaleo (circa 1642–1718). The portrait was a commission by the composer's nephew Felice Bernardo Ricordati and his pupil Bernardo Gaffi.

Charles Stewart, an officer in the Papal army who died in 1864, is buried in the basilica. He was the son of John Stewart, Prince Charles Edward Stuart's ("Charles III", the "Young Pretender") "maestro di casa". Charles had ennobled John as a baronet in 1784.

Just outside the Basilica is the original sculpture of When I was a Stranger, created by Canadian artist Timothy Schmalz as part of the Matthew 25 collection installed throughout Rome on the occasion of the Extraordinary Jubilee of Mercy.

The Basilica made international headlines in early 2026 when Italian newspaper La Repubblica noted that the restoration of a 2000 painting of an angel, flanking a bust of Umberto II, bore an apparent resemblance to Prime Minister Giorgia Meloni. The Diocese of Rome said it would "immediately initiate the necessary investigations", while the painting in question was subsequently covered with a layer of paint or plaster.

== List of cardinal protectors ==
- Malcolm Ranjith (2010.20.11 – present)
- Luigi Poggi (2005.02.24 – 2010.05.04)
- Opilio Rossi (1987.06.22 – 2004.02.09)
- Pietro Parente (1967.06.29 – 1986.12.29)
- Pietro Ciriaci (1964.09.26 – 1966.12.30)
- Manuel Arteaga y Betancourt (1946.02.28 – 1963.03.20)
- Carlo Cremonesi (1935.12.19 – 1943.11.25)
- Pietro Gasparri (1915.01.22 – 1934.11.18)
- Angelo Di Pietro (1903.06.22 – 1914.12.05)
- Mieczysław Halka Ledóchowski (1896.11.30 – 1902.07.22)
- Gustav Adolf von Hohenlohe-Schillingsfürst (1895.12.02 – 1896.10.30)
- Lucien-Louis-Joseph-Napoléon Bonaparte (1879.09.19 – 1895.11.19)
- Domenico Carafa Spina di Trajetto (1879.05.12 – 1879.06.17)
- Fabio Maria Asquini (1877.09.21 – 1878.12.22)
- Filippo de Angelis (1867.09.20 – 1877.07.08)
- Benedetto Barberini (1856.06.16 – 1863.04.10)
- Giacomo Filippo Fransoni (1855.09.28 – 1856.04.20)
- Carlo Oppizzoni (1839.07.08 – 1855.04.13)
- Joseph Fesch (1822.12.02 – 1839.05.13)
- Giulio Gabrielli (1819.12.17 – 1822.09.26)
- Giovanni Filippo Gallarati Scotti (1818.12.21 – 1819.10.06)
- Bartolomeo Pacca (1818.10.02 – 1818.12.21)
- Francesco Carafa Spina di Trajetto (1788.09.15 – 1807.08.03, 1807.08.03 – 1818.09.20 in commendam)
- Giovanni Carlo Boschi (1784.09.20 – 1788.09.06)
- Marcantonio Colonna (1784.06.25 – 1784.09.20)
- Carlo Vittorio Amedeo delle Lanze (1783.07.18 – 1784.01.25)
- Giuseppe Pozzobonelli (1770.05.28 – 1783.04.27)
- Giacomoi Oddi (1763.03.21 – 1770.05.02)
- Johann Theodor Herzog von Bayern (Jean-Théodore de Bavière) (1761.07.13 – 1763.01.27)
- Domenico Silvio Passionei (1759.02.12 – 1761.07.05)
- Thomas Philip Wallrad de Hénin-Liétard d'Alsace (1752.07.17 – 1759.01.05)
- Giulio Alberoni (1740.08.29 – 1752.06.26)
- Gianantonio Davia (1737.02.11 – 1740.01.11)
- Giuseppe Renato Imperiali, O. B. E. (1727.01.20 – 1737.01.15)
- Giuseppe Sacripante (1726.07.31 – 1727.01.04)
- Galeazzo Marescotti (1708.04.30 – 1726.07.03)
- Francesco Nerli (iuniore) (1704.11.17 – 1708.04.08)
- Carlo Barberini (1685.04.30 – 1704.10.02)
- Luigi Omodei (1680.01.08 – 1685.04.26)
- Alderano Cibo (1677.09.13 – 1679.02.06)
- Niccolò Albergati-Ludovisi (1676.10.19 – 1677.09.13)
- Carlo Rossetti (1672.11.14 – 1676.10.19)
- Cesare Facchinetti (1671.08.24 – 1672.11.14)
- Rinaldo d'Este (1618–1672) (1671.03.18 – 1671.08.24)
- Virginio Orsini, O. B. E. (1668.01.30 – 1671.03.18)
- Giulio Gabrielli (1667.11.14 – 1668.01.30)
- Ernst Adalbert von Harrach (1667.07.18 – 1667.10.25)
- Stefano Durazzo (1666.10.11 – 1667.07.11)
- Francesco Maria Brancaccio (1663.07.02 – 1666.10.11)
- Giovanni Battista Maria Pallotta (1661.11.21 – 1663.07.02)
- Girolamo Colonna (1659.04.21 – 1661.11.21)
- Luigi Capponi (1629.08.20 – 1659.04.06)
- Giovanni Garzia Millini (1627.04.14 – 1629.08.20)
- Carlo Emmanuele Pio di Savoia (1626.03.16 – 1627.04.14)
- Carlo Gaudenzio Madruzzo (1626.03.02 – 1626.09.16)
- Domenico Ginnasi (1624.09.16 – 1626.03.02)
- Andrea Baroni Peretti Montalto (1621.10.24 – 1624.09.16)
- Bartolomeo Cesi (1621.03.29 – 1621.10.18)
- Ottavio Bandini (1615.09.16 – 1621.03.27)
- Francesco Maria Bourbon del Monte Santa Maria (1612.06.04 – 1615.09.16)
- Benedetto Giustiniani (1611.08.17 – 1612.06.04)
- Gregorio Petrocchini, O. E. S. A. (1611.01.24 – 1611.08.17)
- Giovanni Evangelista Pallotta (1603.06.16 – 1611.01.24)
- Girolamo Bernerio, O. P. (1602.06.17 – 1603.06.16)
- Simeone Tagliavia d’Aragonia (1600.08.30 – 1602.06.17)
- Antonmaria Salviati (1600.04.23 – 1600.08.30)
- Pedro de Deza (1597.08.18 – 1600.04.23)
- Ludovico Madruzzo (1591.03.20 – 1597.08.18)
- Michele Bonelli, O. P. (1589.11.08 – 1591.03.20)
- Gabriele Paleotti (1587.05.11 – 1589.11.08)
- Marco Antonio Colonna (1586.10.13 – 1587.05.11)
- Innico d’Avalos d’Aragona, O.S. (1567.03.03 – 1586.10.13)
- Fulvio Giulio della Corgna, O. B. E. (1566.01.30 – 1567.03.03)
- Francesco Gonzaga (1562.07.16 – 1564.03.01 pro illa vice Deaconry, 1564.03.01 – 1566.01.06)
- Georges d’Armagnac (1556.06.12 – 1562.07.06)
- Giovanni Girolamo Morone (1553.12.11 – 1556.06.12)
- Giovanni Domenico de Cupis (1529.05.24 – 1531.09.22, 1531.09.22 – 1553.10.10 in commendam)
- Silvio Passerini (1517.07.06 – 1520.09.17, 1521.01.05 – 1529.04.20)
- Jorge da Costa (1489.10.15 – 1491.10.10, 1491.10.10 – 1508.09.18 in commendam)
- Giovanni di Aragona (1483.09.10 – 1485.10.17)
- Filippo Calandrini (1451.11.24 – 1468.10.14)
- Jean Le Jeune (1441 – 1451.09.09)
- Giovanni Vitelleschi (1437.08.09 – 1440.04.02)
- Jean de la Rochetaillée (1426.05.27 – 1437.03.24)
- Luca Manzoli, O. Hum. (1408.09.19 – 1409)
- Martín de Zalba (1390–1403)
- Pierre de Sortenac (1375.12.20 – 1384.03)
- Jean de la Tour, O. S. B. Clun. (1371.05.30 – 1374.04.15)
- Étienne Aubert (1368.09.22 – 1369.09.29)
- Guillaume Bragose (1362.12.06 – 1367?)
- Annibaldo di Ceccano (1327.12.18 – 1333)
- Hugh of Evesham (1281.04.12 – 1287.07.27)
- Guy de Bourgogne, O. Cist. (1262.05.22 – 1272.05.20)
- John of Toledo, O. Cist. (1244.05.28 – 1262)
- Sinibaldo Fieschi (later Pope Innocent IV) (1227.09.18 – 1243.06.25)
- Pietro (1188.03 – 1190?)
- Alberto di Morra (later Pope Gregory VIII) (1158 – 1187.10.21)
- Ubaldo (1155.12 – 1157?)
- Cenzio (1150 – 1154)
- Ugo (1144.05.19 – 1150.09.21)
- Ugo Misini, C.R.S.M.R. (1144.02.08 – 1150)
- Anselmo, C.R.S. Pietro in Caelo aureo (1126 – 1143?)
- Gregorius (of Siena) (1116 – 1125)
- Landulfus (1106 – 1116?)
- Leo (c. 1069 – c. 1084)

== Interments ==
- Pompeo Batoni (not visible)
- Josef Mysliveček
- Bernardo Pasquini
- Nicolas Poussin
- Charles Stewart
- Francesco Gonzaga (1538–1566)
- Filippo Calandrini

== See also ==
- San Silvestro in Capite

== Notes ==
Preceded by San Lorenzo in Damaso	Landmarks of Rome; San Lorenzo in Lucina	Succeeded by Santa Maria Ausiliatrice, Rome
