= Lanfranco (disambiguation) =

Lanfranco may refer to:

- Lanfranco, master-builder of the Modena Cathedral
- Guido Lanfranc of Milan (c. 1250–1306), professor of Surgery
- Giovanni Lanfranco (1582–1647), Italian painter
- Guido Lanfranco (born 1930), Maltese writer on natural history and folklore
- Giovanni Lanfranco (volleyball) (born 1956), Italian volleyball player
- Frankie Dettori, flat racing jockey
- Lanfranco (horse), British-trained thoroughbred racehorse

== See also ==
- Lanfranc
