= Guy de Chauliac =

French physician and surgeon

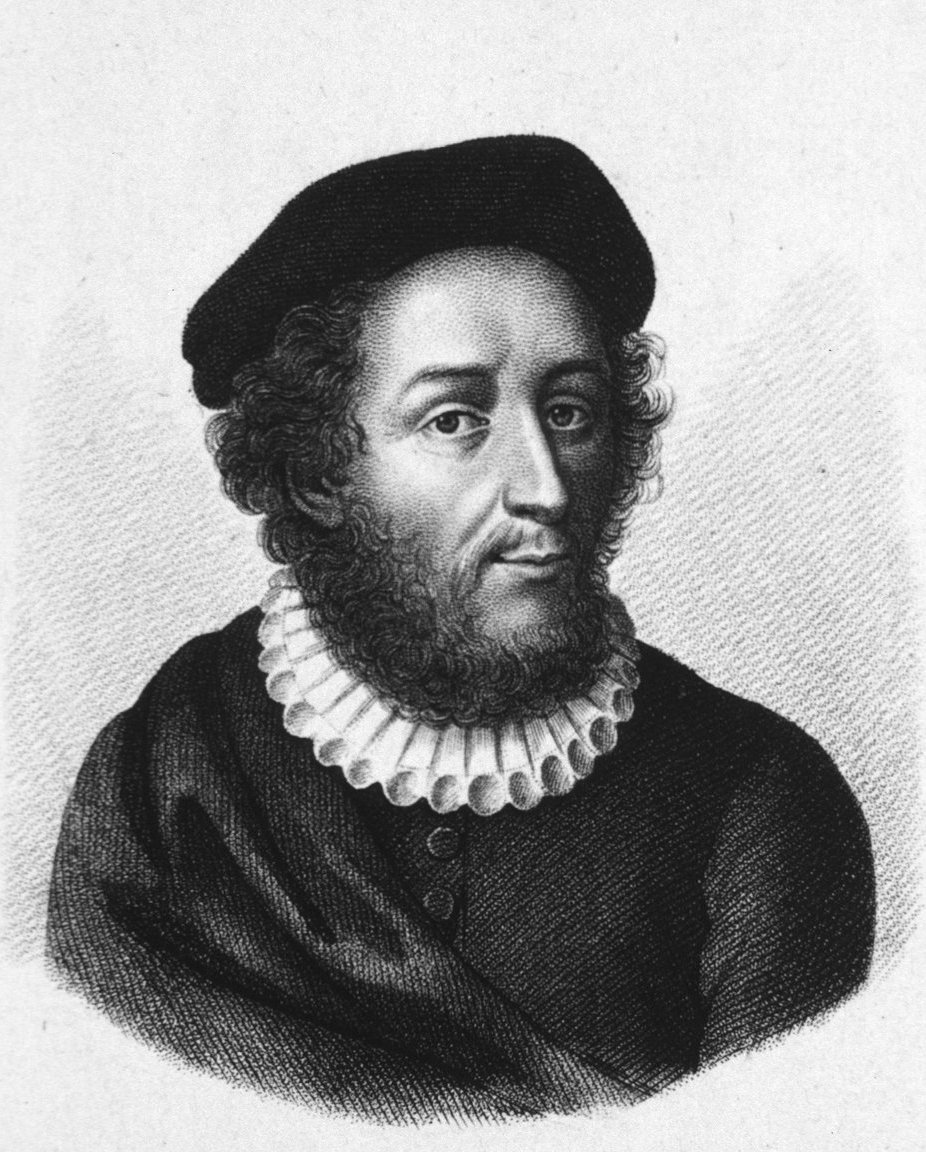
- A 16th-century depiction
- Born: c. 1300; Chaulhac, Lozère, France
- Died: 1368 (aged 67–68); Avignon, France
- Citizenship: Kingdom of France
- Education: University of Toulouse
- Occupations: physician and surgeon
- Medical career
- Notable works: Chirurgia Magna

Guy de Chauliac (French: [də ʃoljak]), also called Guido or Guigo de Cauliaco (c. 1300 – 25 July 1368), was a French physician and surgeon who wrote a lengthy and influential treatise on surgery in Latin, titled Chirurgia magna. It was translated into many other languages (including Middle English) and widely read by physicians in late medieval Europe.

== Life ==
Guy de Chauliac was born in Chaulhac, Lozère, France, into a family of modest means. He began his study of medicine in Toulouse before going to study in Montpellier, the centre for medical knowledge in 14th-century France. He was in Paris between 1315 and 1320, and around 1325, he became a Master of Medicine and Surgery. After receiving his degree, he went to Bologna to study anatomy under Nicola Bertuccio, from whom he may have learned surgical techniques. It is unknown whether Chauliac applied his surgical studies and knowledge. Charles H. Talbot writes,

It was seemingly from books that [Chauliac] learned his surgery.... He may have used the knife when embalming the bodies of dead popes, but he was careful to avoid it on living patients.

Others, including André Thevenet, claim that Chauliac moved to Mende and then Lyons to practice medicine after learning the art of surgery from Bertuccio.

Chauliac's reputation as a physician grew quickly. He was invited to the papal court in Avignon to serve as a personal physician to Pope Clement VI (1342–1352). He went on to become a personal physician to Pope Innocent VI (1352–1362) and then to Pope Urban V (1362–1370). He died in Avignon in 1368. He completed his great treatise in 1353.

=== Black Death ===
When the Black Death arrived in Avignon in 1348, physicians fled the city. However, Chauliac stayed on and treated plague patients and documenting symptoms meticulously. He claimed to have been himself infected and survived the disease.

Through his observations, Chauliac distinguished between the two forms of the disease, the bubonic plague and the pneumonic plague. As a precautionary measure, he advised Clement to keep a fire burning continuously in his chamber and to keep visitors out.

He gave the following description to the papal court:

The great death toll began in our case in the month of January [1348], and lasted for the space of seven months. It was of two kinds: the first lasted two months; with continuous fever and spitting of blood; and death occurred within three days. The second lasted for the whole of the remainder of the time, also with continuous fever, and with ulcers and boils in the extremities, principally under the arm-pits and in the groin; and death took place within five days. And [it] was of so great a contagion (especially when there was spitting of blood) that not only through living in the same house but merely through looking, one person caught it from the other.

The plague was recognised as being contagious although the agent of contagion was unknown. As treatment, Chauliac recommended air be purified, venesection (bleeding) and a healthy diet. The outbreak of plague and widespread death was blamed on Jews, who in some areas were believed to have poisoned wells. Chauliac fought against this idea and used science to declare the theory untrue.

== Works ==
=== Chirurgia magna ===
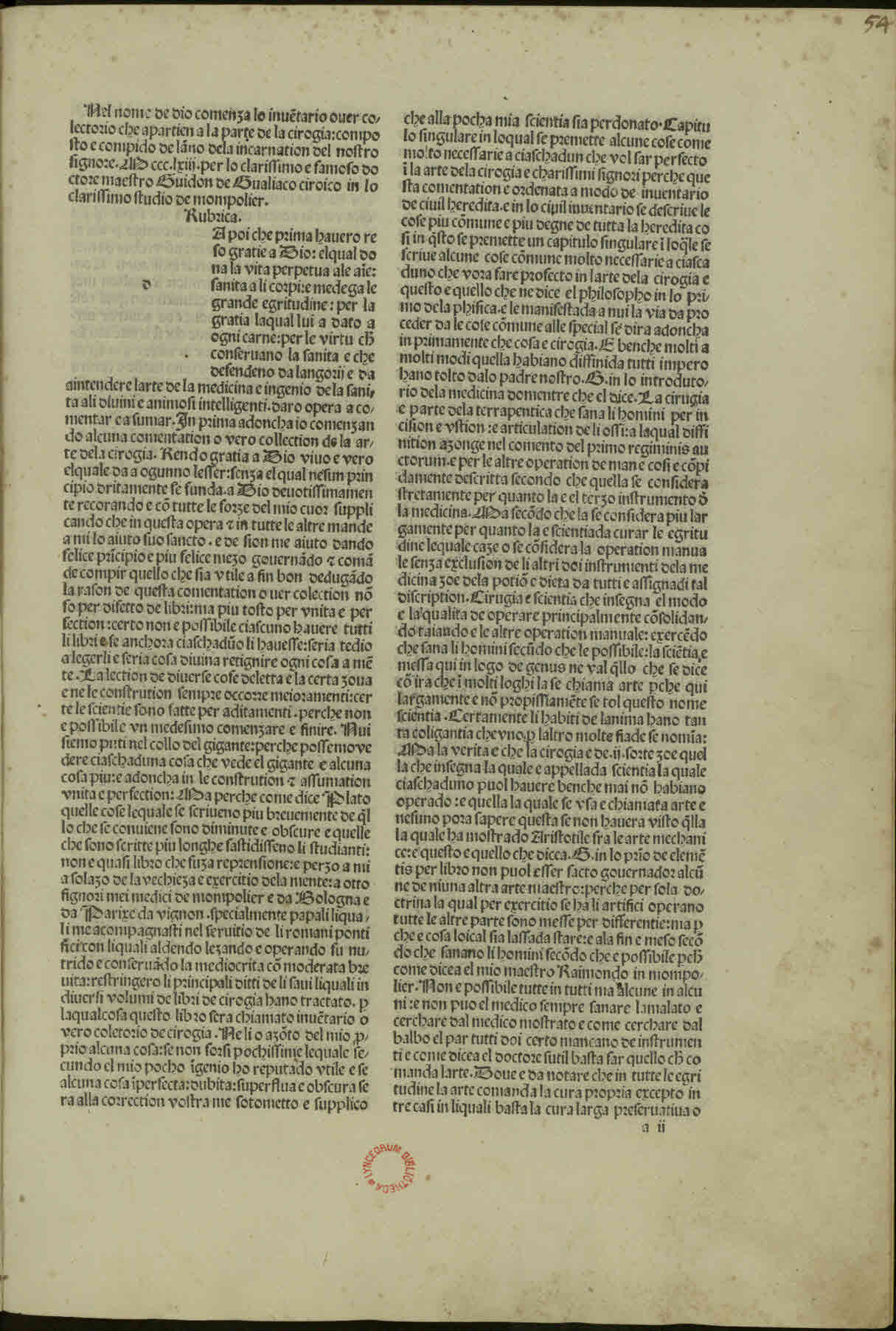
Chirurgia, 1493

Chauliac's seminal work on surgery, Chirurgia magna, was finished in 1363 in Avignon just after the bubonic plague. In seven volumes, the treatise covers anatomy, bloodletting, cauterization, drugs, anesthetics, wounds, fractures, ulcers, special diseases, and antidotes. Among Chaulic's treatments that he described were the use of oakum, bandages medicated with egg whites, rubbing the scrotum and performing bloodletting to cure a nosebleed. He describes surgical techniques such as intubation, tracheotomy and suturing, as well as the use of anaesthetic gas when performing amputations on patients.

Chauliac quoted frequently from other medical works written by contemporaries earlier physicians and anatomists, as he sought to describe the history of medicine. He claimed that surgery began with Hippocrates and Galen and was developed in the Islamic world by Haly Abbas, Albucasis and Al-Razi. Through his position as papal physician, Chauliac had access to Galen's texts, recently translated by Niccolò da Reggio from original Greek versions, which were more accurate than the Latin translations.

As well as owing a debt to Galen, Chirurgia magna was greatly influenced by Islamic scientists, and Chauliac references Avicenna often in the work. The work became popular and was translated into English, French, Dutch, Italian Provençal and Irish, the last by Cormac Mac Duinnshléibhe. It was reworked multiple times, including to remove references to Islamic scientists, to the point that the work was no longer recognizable as Chauliac's own.

Chauliac recognized the importance of Montpellier with respect to surgical study.

==== Emphasis on anatomy ====
Galen's influence on Chauliac can clearly be seen in the latter's belief that surgeons should have a thorough understanding of anatomy: "A surgeon who does not know his anatomy is like a blind man carving a log". He also describes the dissection of a corpse in accordance with Galen's beliefs about the human body. The unwillingness of Chauliac and his contemporaries to look outside textbook knowledge was one of the reasons that Chauliac's anatomical descriptions were not always correct.

== Other works ==
Three other works were written by Chauliac: Practica astrolabii (De astronomia), an essay on astrology; De ruptura, describeing different types of hernias; and De subtilianti diaeta, describing treatments for cataracts.

== Sources ==
- Guigo De Caulhiaco (Guy de Chaulliac), Inventarium Sive Chirurgia Magna, Michael R. McVaugh, Margrete S. Ogden (editors), Brill Publishers, 1997. ISBN 90-04-10784-3. Reviewed here:
- Guy de Chauliac Biography (c. 1300–c. 1368), 2008. ISBN 90-04-10784-3. Reviewed here:
- Ogden, Margaret. (1977). "Review of Guy de Chauliac's Middle English Translation". The Review of English Studies. Vol 28, number 111.
- Wallner, Björn. (1995). ”An Interpolated Middle English Version of the Anatomy of Guy de Chauliac. Part 1. Text”, Lund University Press. ISBN 0-86238-380-3.
