= Guy de Bourgogne =

French monk, Abbot and Cardinal

Guy de Bourgogne, O.Cist. (born in Burgundy, date unknown; died in Rome, 20 May 1272), was a French monk, Abbot, and Cardinal of the Roman Catholic Church.

Guy was Abbot of Cîteaux from 1257 or 1258 until 1262. There was evidently some considerable tension in the Abbey during his administration, including a body of dissident monks. Pope Alexander IV was forced to intervene. In a letter of 13 June 1260, for the sake of peace in the monastery and so that monastic unity not be destroyed, the Pope said, he forbade members of the Order to make appeals outside of their Order whenever faced with some difficulty or other which might compromise the rigor of the observance. Considering the papal letter, the appeals must have been to the Pope himself. One of the irritants was the work of Etienne de Lexington, Abbot of Clairvaux (1243-ca. 1255), who, following the lead of his predecessor, had established a college in Paris, the Couvent des Bernardins or du Chardonnet, for the education of Cistercian monks. This educational ambition was a departure from the original rigor of the Cistercian rule. It is said that Abbot Guy de Bourgogne had Abbot Etienne deposed.

Guy de Bourgogne was created a Cardinal by Pope Urban IV in a Consistory held on 20 May 1262, and named Cardinal Priest of San Lorenzo in Lucina.

Cardinal Guy was appointed Apostolic Legate in Denmark, Sweden, Bremen, Magdeburg, Gniezno, and Salzburg on 8 June 1265. In 1266 he held a synod at Bremen with Archbishop Hildebold. proceed to a synod in Magdeburg. He then arrived in Denmark, still in 1266, where his task was to compose the differences between King Erik V, the Queen Mother Margaret Sambiria, Archbishop Jakob Erlandsen of Lund who had been exiled to Germany, and the nobility, instigated by Duke Valdemar of Jutland. Pope Urban IV had sided with the bishops against the King. Cardinal Guy summoned the king to a meeting, but, justifiably pleading the lack of security, the King refused to attend, and appealed directly to the Pope. Cardinal Guy then travelled to Lübeck, where he met with the Archbishop and several other exiled bishops. Obtaining no satisfaction from the Legate, Archbishop Erlandsen travelled to Viterbo to deal directly with the new Pope, Clement IV; he never returned to Denmark. Cardinal Guy then visited Sweden, where he granted an indulgence to the Cistercian abbey church of Nydala.

Between November 1266 and May 1267 Cardinal Guy held four synods. In Bremen (1266), Magdeburg (1266), Breslau (1267) and Vienna (1267). The synod held in Breslau on February 8, 1267 was designed to reinforce the Christian faith and the Church's dominion in the Eastern lands of Poland. In his opening remarks, Cardinal Guy noted that, acting on the Pope’s commission, he immediately began “to uproot and eradicate the new plot, planting in it new saplings and laying out new paths under God’s providence.” The legatine synod in Breslau produced several unique and forward-looking decrees concerning the Jews of the Gniezno province, measures that would later influence the emergence of Jewish ghettos in the sixteenth century.

He celebrated a synod at Vienna on 10 May 1267, attended by six bishops and many other prelates, in which, among other things, he attempted once again to demand clerical celibacy and the separation of clerics from their wives and concubines. He visited Kraków beginning on 28 June 1267. He celebrated another synod at Bratislava in Hungary, attended by eight bishops, in the same year. He preached the Holy Land Crusade. He was recalled by Pope Clement IV in a letter of 8 May 1267. and again in late October, 1267. Pope Clement wrote to him on October 26/27, 1267, that he was sending a legate to replace him, though travel was being blocked by Conradin; as soon as the legate arrives, he is to return to Viterbo. A subscription of Cardinal Guy indicates that he was back in Viterbo on 28 February 1268.

Cardinal Gui took part in the very long Election of 1268–1271 at Viterbo, following the death of Clement IV, which came to be known as the first conclave. He signed the letter of protest, as did all of the Cardinals, on 20 August 1270, which required the Podestà and the people of Viterbo to swear not to molest the Cardinals or the members of their entourages. In the last stage of the negotiations, he was one of the six cardinals elected to the Commission of Compromise, who finally, on 1 September 1271, chose Teobaldo Visconti, Archdeacon of Liège and Papal Legate in the Holy Land. He subscribed the Electoral Manifesto. Teobaldo arrived in Italy in January, 1272, and was ordained to the priesthood in Rome on 19 March, and consecrated and crowned on 27 March 1272.

Cardinal Guy de Bourgogne died less than two months later, on 20 May 1272.

== Bibliography ==
- Jean Roy, Nouvelle histoire des cardinaux François Tome IV (Paris: Poinçot, 1787).
- Lorenzo Cardella, Memorie delle cardinali della Santa Romana Chiesa I, parte 2 (Roma 1792), pp. 305–307.
- E. Jordan, "Les promotions de cardinaux sous Urbain IV," Revue d' histoire et de littérature religieuses 5 (1900) 322–334.
- Ferdinand Gregorovius, History of the City of Rome in the Middle Ages, Volume V. 2, second edition, revised (London: George Bell, 1906).
- Antonio Franchi, Il conclave di Viterbo (1268-1271) e le sue origini: saggio con documenti inediti (Assisi: Porziuncola, 1993).
- Gary M. Radke, Viterbo: Profile of a Thirteenth-century Papal Palace (Cambridge University Press 1996).
- Andreas Fischer, Kardinale im Konklave. Die lange Sedisvakanz der Jahre 1268 bis 1271 (Stuttgart: W. de Gruyter-Max Niemeyer 2008) [Bibliothek des Deutschen Historischen Instituts in Rome, 118].
