= Gabriel da Fonseca =

Portuguese New Christian physician (1586 - 1668)

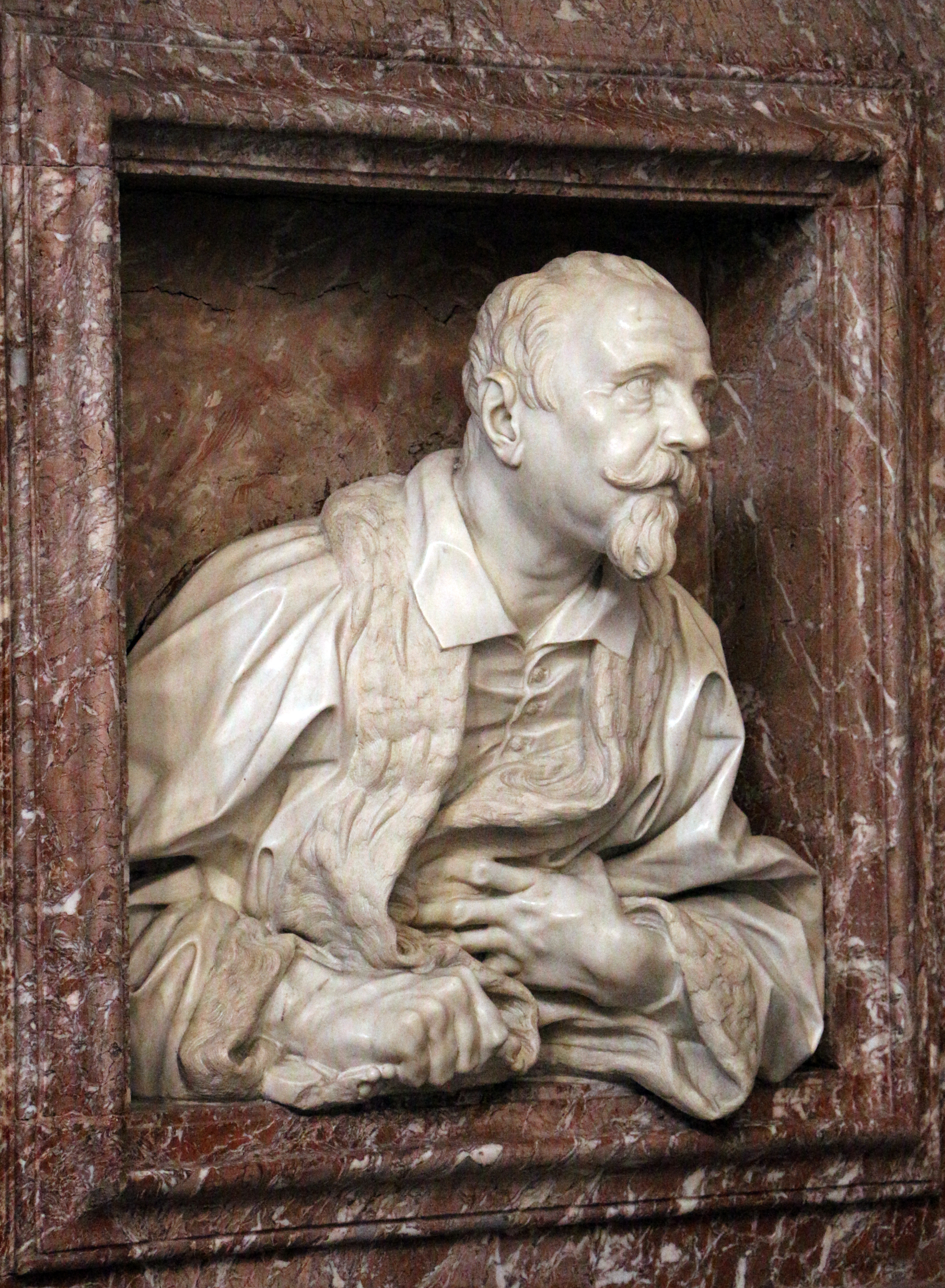
- A bust of Fonseca by Italian sculptor Gian Lorenzo Bernini, located in San Lorenzo in Lucina
- Born: February 1586; Lamego, Portugal
- Died: 12 December 1668 (aged 82); Parione, Rome
- Occupation: Physician

Gabriel da Fonseca (February 1586 - 12 December 1668) was a Portuguese New Christian physician who worked as Pope Innocent X’s personal physician.

He settled in Rome in the 1620s, spending his career treating high-ranking Roman Catholic clergymen. He died in Parione in 1668. A bust of Fonseca, sculpted by Gian Lorenzo Bernini, is located in the basilica of San Lorenzo in Lucina.

== Background ==
Gabriel da Fonseca was born in Lamego in late February 1586 to Lisbon treasurer Diogo Rodrigues Fonseca and Isabel Gomes. He studied at the University of Pisa in 1603, receiving his doctorate in 1609. It was common for Portuguese physicians to study in Italy during this time due to the prestige Italian institutions offered. It is possible Fonseca left Portugal to hide his Jewish origins, as Philip II of Portugal had —in 1604, by royal decree — officially excluded Jews from studying or practicing medicine.

Fonseca's uncle, Rodrigo da Fonseca, was already an established physician in Pisa, and probably encouraged him to become a physician. Fonseca also had a sister, Violante, who died in Rome.

== Career ==
Fonseca was Professor of Logic at the Academy of Pisa from 1609 to 1611. Afterwards he left for Rome to tend to bishop Gaspar de Borja y Velasco.

Fonseca accompanied Borja to Naples upon Borja's appointment as Viceroy in 1620. Fonseca then entered the service of Borja's successor, Spanish bishop Antonio Zapata y Cisneros, and also taught at the University of Naples. He eventually returned to Rome, where he lived until his death.

Many of Fonseca's family settled in Rome. His allegiance to Rome was so strong that he apparently rejected offers to work for Grand Duke of Tuscany Ferdinando II de' Medici and Holy Roman Emperor Ferdinand III, as it would require relocating. Fonseca went on to treat high-ranking members of the Roman Catholic clergy, such as future Pope Urban VIII, Maffeo Barberini.

In 1623, he published his book Medici Oeconomia economies, a treatise of medical deontology. Fonseca and Cardinal Juan de Lugo, a Spanish theologian, were among the first advocates in Rome promoting the use of quinine to treat malaria.

After Giovanni Battista Pamphili was elected Pope in 1644, Fonseca was hired as his personal physician, for which he was well paid. Pamphili had such strong trust in Fonseca that he regarded him not only as his physician but also as a private advisor. Fonseca claims he was in service to the Pamphili family for over two decades. This lasted for eight years until, in March 1654, the Pope abruptly expelled Fonseca and refused to see him. According to Rome chronicler Giacinto Gigli, Fonseca had defended a barber who had bled the irascible Pope.

Fonseca was Professor of Medicine at La Sapienza University for over two decades. He was first recorded as being on the university's payroll in 1646, and retired in 1668.

== Personal life ==
On 14 September 1618 he married Portuguese woman Catarina Gomes, daughter of António Gomes of Elvas. They settled in the parish of San Tommaso in Parione. They had at least six children - Antonia, Olimpia, Isabella, Baldassarre, Gaspare and Anna - all presumably born in Rome.

Fonseca was an associate of many Italian-based physicians, such as surgeon Marco Aurelio Severino, professor Antonio Santorello, physician Giulio Cesare Benedetti Guelfaglione and Irish professor Niall Ó Glacáin.

== Death ==
Gabriel da Fonseca died on 12 December 1668 in Parione, Rome, having become a Roman citizen in 1638. His death date is sometimes given as 20 May, however, 12 December is corroborated by his son Gaspare, who references his father's death in a letter to grand duke Ferdinando II de’ Medici.

== Legacy ==
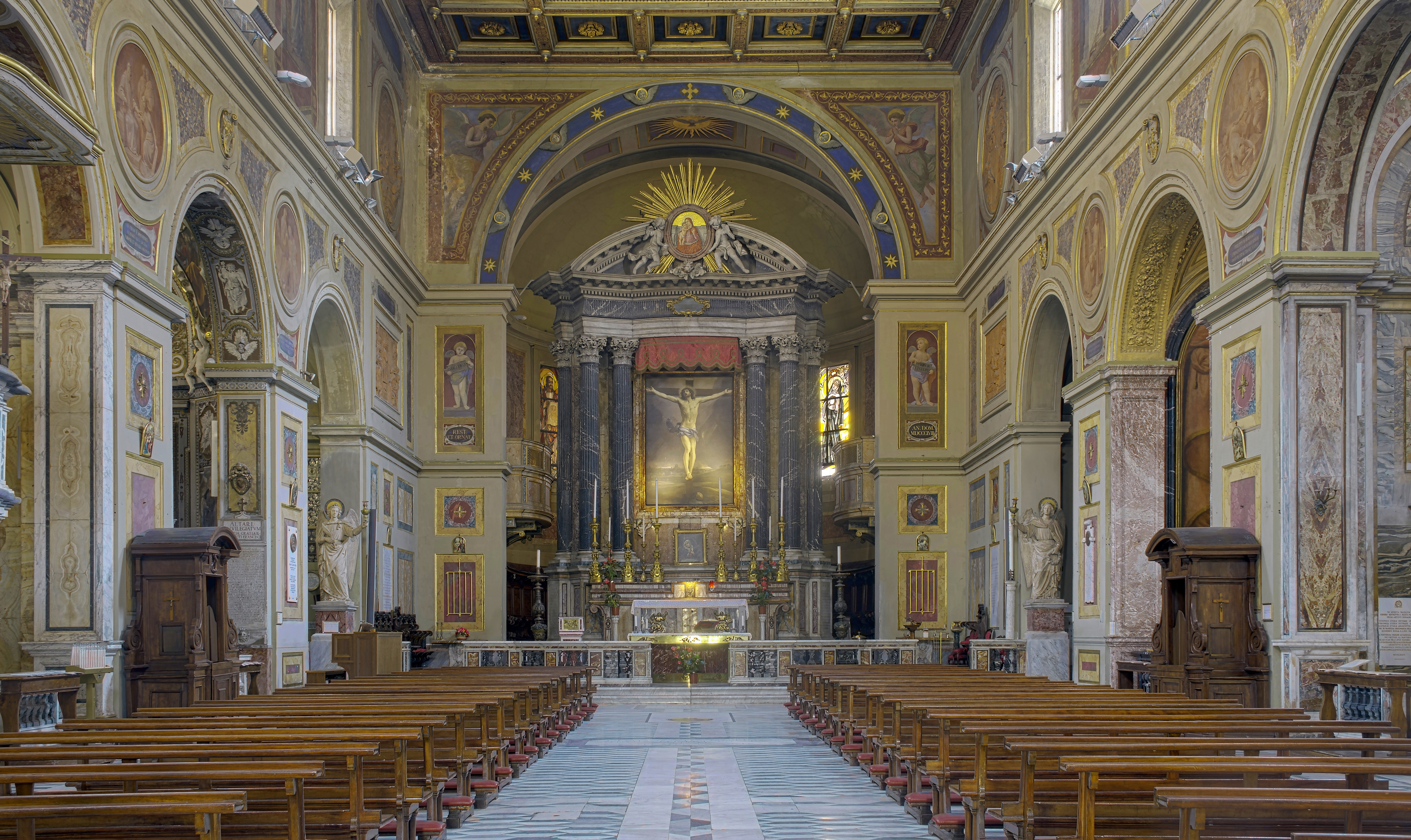
Interior of the San Lorenzo in Lucina

Around 1663, Fonseca commissioned Italian sculptor and architect Gian Lorenzo Bernini to construct a chapel in the church of San Lorenzo in Lucina, in central Rome. Fonseca's desire was for the chapel to commemorate the settling of the Fonseca family in Rome, as well as to be a resting place for his deceased family members. In his will, Fonseca requested he be buried in the chapel, with a detailed tombstone listing his achievements, but it seems no tombstone was ever created.

A bust of Fonseca, sculpted by Bernini, is located in the church. It depicts Fonseca dressed in doctor’s robes while holding a rosary. It is considered a pivotal work in Bernini's later era, and was probably completed after Fonseca's death.
