= Bust of Gabriele Fonseca =

Sculpture by Gianlorenzo Bernini

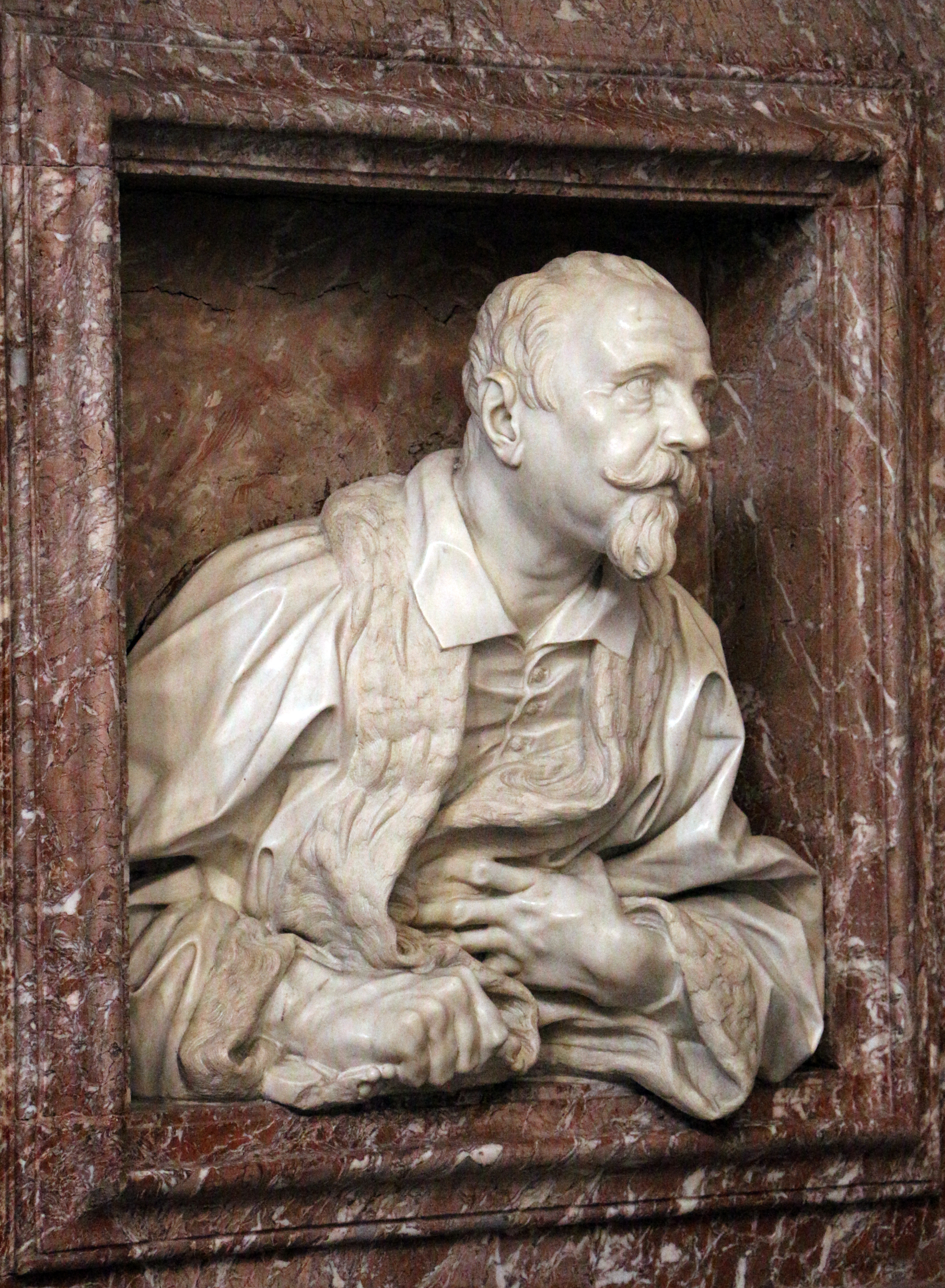
- Artist: Gian Lorenzo Bernini
- Year: 1668–1674
- Catalogue: 75
- Type: Sculpture
- Medium: Marble
- Subject: Gabriele Fonseca
- Dimensions: Over life-size
- Location: San Lorenzo in Lucina; Rome
- Preceded by: Equestrian statue of Louis XIV (Bernini)
- Followed by: Blessed Ludovica Albertoni

The Bust of Gabriele Fonseca is a sculptural portrait by the Italian artist Gian Lorenzo Bernini. Executed sometime between 1668 and 1674, the work is located in San Lorenzo in Lucina in Rome, Italy. Gabriele Fonseca was Pope Innocent X's personal physician.

== See also ==
- List of works by Gian Lorenzo Bernini
