= Mairéad Dunlevy =

Museum curator and Irish costume expert (1941–2008)

- Born: Mairéad Dunlevy; 31 December 1941; Mountcharles, County Donegal
- Died: 18 March 2008 (aged 66); Dublin, Ireland
- Other name: Mairead Reynolds
- Occupation: Curator

Mairéad Dunlevy (31 December 1941 – 18 March 2008) was an Irish museum curator and costume expert.

== Early life and education ==
Dunlevy was born on 31 December 1941, to James Dunlevy, a general merchant in Mountcharles, County Donegal, and his wife Mairéad (Margaret) Begley. She was the eldest, sister to two boys. The family had many doctors in it including four of her father's siblings - Pearl Dunlevy was an epidemiologist working on eradicating TB. Dunlevy was educated in Glencoagh national school and Coláiste Bhríde in Falcarragh, County Donegal. She went on to teacher training college in Carysfort in Dublin and started work in the Mount Anville National school in Kilmacud. Dunlevy studied archaeology in University College Dublin by night under Rúaidhrí de Valera and followed the BA with an MA in Irish medieval combs.

She started going to the Gaeltacht in Ranafast to improve her Irish when she was nine. Dunlevy had an interest in the Irish language and in Irish traditional crafts. As a general merchant in Mountcharles, her father stocked embroidered Irish-linen, made under the care of his wife. The area had a number of cottage industries of crochet, lace and embroidery. Dunlevy was a friend of Harry Swan of Buncrana.

== Career ==
In 1960, she was editor of Inniu, the Irish-language newspaper. She also worked in Bunratty Castle on excavations under John Durell Hunt. In 1970, she started working as the assistant keeper in National Museum of Ireland's art and industrial division. Her background in Irish crafts and her education allowed her to work on a new way to interpret Ireland's material culture. Until then the folk arts had been considered more important than those of the upper classes in the 18th and 19th centuries. Dunlevy began to work on those areas which had been ignored, one example being the history of Waterford glass.

Dunlevy's work was interrupted when she married due to the national ban on married women working in the public service which was still in effect. That ended in 1975. Dunlevy returned to the National Museum of Ireland (NMI) and worked on the exhibitions of glass, ceramics and textiles. During 1982 and 1983, Dunlevy was a monthly contributor of articles to the Irish Times to encourage people to visit the museum. Dunlevy was also responsible for the creation of a Dublin city eighteenth century townhouse, furnished and created to show how people lived. It was a joint project by the museum and the Electricity Supply Board. The townhouse opened in 1991 at Number Twenty Nine: Georgian House Museum, Lower Fitzwilliam Street.

From 1990 to 1996 Dunlevy was appointed the first curator of the Hunt Museum. The museum was created in the old Custom House in Limerick city, opening in 1997, to house the collections of John Hunt. The Hunt Museum was the first Irish museum to use docents (volunteer guides) and the organisation of volunteers is the Friends of the Hunt Museum.

She returned to her position in the NMI in 1996 where she was part of creating a new museum of decorative arts at Collins Barracks which also opened in 1997. The museum now houses a permanent display of costumes, titled 'The way we wore', which opened in 2000.

As an authority on historical Irish dress, Dunlevy published multiple books and histories on the topic. She also wrote on the history of the Irish post office and Collin's barracks. She was a frequent lecturer and appeared on radio and television in interviews and documentaries.

Dunlevy spent time working in An Foras Forbartha during the 1970s planning for heritage issues. She represented Ireland the 1997 European euro coinage design committee. She was a member and president of the Donegal Historical Society as well as founding chairman, in 1975, of the Federation for Ulster Local Studies. Dunlevy was a member of Bord na Gaeilge and was chairman of Cumann Merriman. During her tenure with the latter she was responsible for running three summer schools in honour of the Irish poet Brian Merriman.

== Personal life and legacy ==
Although originally married to journalist Arthur Reynolds, and for a time known as either Mairéad Reynolds or Dunlevy-Reynolds, the marriage did not last. When Dunlevy retired in 2002 she had a new partner, businessman John Reihill. Dunlevy died in 2008 at the Blackrock Clinic, Dublin after a battle with cancer. The Reihill family established a foundation in her name and a lecture was inaugurated in 2010 in the University of Limerick. She donated her body to the Royal College of Surgeons.

== Bibliography ==
- Reynolds, Mairéad (December 1983). A History of the Irish Post Office. Dublin: MacDonnell Whyte. p. 91. ISBN 9780950261973
- Dunlevy, Mairéad (1988) A Classification of Early Irish Combs
- --do.-- (1988). Ceramics in Ireland. Ard-Mhʹusaem na hʹEireann. ISBN 978-0-901777-18-8
- --do.-- (1989). Dress in Ireland Collins Press. ISBN 978-1-898256-84-7
- --do.-- (1989). Penrose glass. Dublin: National Museum of Ireland
- --do.-- (1995) Donegal; History and Society: interdisciplinary essays on the history of an Irish county (as editor)
- --do.-- (2001) Jewellery: 17th to 20th centuries
- --do.-- (2002) Dublin Barracks: a brief history of Collins Barracks, Dublin: National Museum of Ireland
- --do.-- (2002). Dublin Barracks: A Brief History of Collins Barracks, Dublin: National Museum of Ireland. ISBN 978-0-901777-91-1
- --do.-- (2011) Pomp and Poverty: a history of silk in Ireland
