= Pearl Dunlevy =

Irish physician and epidemiologist (1909–2002)

Dr. Pearl Dunlevy
- Born: Bridget Margaret (Pearl) Mary Dunlevy; 13 August 1909; Donegal, Ireland
- Died: 3 June 2002 (aged 92); Dublin, Ireland
- Occupation: Physician

Pearl Dunlevy (13 August 1909 – 3 June 2002), was an Irish physician and epidemiologist working on TB and was the first woman president of the Biological Society of the Royal College of Surgeons of Ireland.

== Early life and career ==
Born to George Dunlevy and Maggie Doherty, in Mountcharles, County Donegal, Bridget Margaret Mary Dunlevy, known as Pearl, was one of six children. She was the second youngest and had four brothers and a sister. She was educated in the Loreto Convent, St Stephen's Green, Dublin well as St. Louis Convent in Carrickmacross, County Monaghan. Dunlevy studied medicine at the Royal College of Surgeons in Ireland (RCSI) and graduated in 1932 coming first in the exams. She was a student of Sir Thomas Myles.

Moving to the UK Dunlevy worked in a number of British hospitals:

- 1932–1933 House physician, Eye Hospital, Newcastle-upon-Tyne
- 1933 House physician and surgeon, Nuneaton General Hospital
- 1933-1934 Resident surgical officer, Birmingham Children's Hospital
- 1934 Medical officer, Sydenham Children's Hospital, London
- 1934–1935 House surgeon, Standon Hall Orthopaedic Hospital, Staffordshire.

== Tuberculosis in Children ==
Returning to Ireland in 1936 Dunlevy graduated in first place from University College Dublin with a diploma in public health and was appointed temporary assistant county medical officer of health in Donegal. After two years she was appointed assistant medical officer of health in Dublin. While in Dublin Dunlevy was resident at Crooksling tuberculosis sanatorium where she gained substantial experience in the treatment and control of childhood Tuberculosis (TB) cases. In 1945 Dunlevy established the Primary TB clinic in Dublin at the Carnegie Trust Child Welfare Centre in Lord Edward Street. The aim was to identify children with TB and begin to treat them in such a way as to reduce the amount of time they spent in sanatoria. In part this was due to a shortage of beds.

In 1947, having been appointed a Dublin Corporation TB officer, Dunlevy toured Norway, Denmark and Sweden with three medical colleagues from Dublin Corporation's TB service to investigate the success of the BCG vaccine. By this time she had begun an x-ray and testing program to assess the infection rates and find where infection was most frequently sourced. The following year she was appointed assistant medical officer for Dublin city. She pointed out at the time that medical staff were paid less for tuberculin testing of patients than veterinarians were for the testing of cattle.

Dunlevy had developed a reputation for rigour and organisation and was selected to pilot childhood BCG vaccination scheme in Dublin. Her skills ensured the schemes effectiveness. TB deaths in children and pregnant women had risen during the war and reached a peak in 1947. Vaccination schemes had been tried before but the war had interrupted progress. The new pilot programme began in October 1948. By 1949 childhood deaths had reduced by two thirds. Dunlevy's program focused on statistics and data which enabled them to target specific households and areas for both treatment and vaccination.

James Deeny said that

Dunlevy built up from nothing the highly efficient, beautifully organised Dublin scheme, which ran like clockwork, was availed of widely, produced no unfavourable incidents, reduced childhood tuberculosis to vanishing point, and lowered dramatically the awful incidence of tuberculosis meningitis in babies in Dublin. All this was carried out during the very difficult postwar conditions in the city'

A planned children's sanatorium became unnecessary and was turned into an adult facility due to the success of the scheme. Once the scheme was extended to include newborns at maternity hospitals the reduction in children's deaths from TB was over 82%.

Those doctors who followed the Scandinavian models saw impressive results. Those who took their lead from Britain were less successful. The new Department of Health, the state's chief medical officer James Deeny and minister for health, Noel Browne contributed to the success of the Dublin vaccination scheme. Dunlevy was appointed by the minister to the national vaccination committee which held its last meeting in December 1978.

== Later career ==
During her role as senior assistant chief medical officer in the Dublin Health Authority infectious diseases gradually receded. One of the last major schemes in which she was involved was the rubella vaccination program beginning in 1971. Another was the combined diphtheria, tetanus and pertussis (whooping cough) vaccine. The trials for the combined vaccine has since gained notoriety due to the lack of consent obtained for children who took part in the trials and were in state institutions at the time. Dunlevy went on, in 1971 until her retirement in 1976 to work as the deputy chief medical officer in the Eastern Health Board.

Dunlevy was now an international expert in childhood epidemiology and published papers in the British Medical Journal, the Journal of the Medical Association of Éire, the Irish Journal of Medical Science, and the Journal of the Irish Medical Association. Once retired Dunlevy wrote a regular column for the Irish Medical Times.

Dunlevy was deeply involved in the associations related to her expertise. She was president of the Biological Society of the RCSI in 1952, president of the Irish Society for Medical Officers of Health, and on the committee of the 'women's federation' of the Irish Medical Association. She was a member (1978) and fellow (1980) of the Royal College of Physicians of Ireland (RCPI), a member of the faculty of community medicine of the RCPI, and a fellow of the Royal Academy of Medicine of Ireland (RAMI).

== Personal life ==
Dunlevy's elder sister Annie ('Nan') Josephine Dunlevy (1903–88), also graduated from the RCSI and practised as a psychiatrist in Donegal and Dublin. She also lectured in anatomy at the RCSI. She lived for many years at various Dublin addresses with her sister. She was the aunt of museum curator and costume expert Mairéad Dunlevy.

Dunlevy had a long time companion Kathleen Hughes. She died 3 June 2002 in Dublin, and was buried in Shanganagh Cemetery.
