= Lanfranc of Milan =

Italian cleric and surgeon

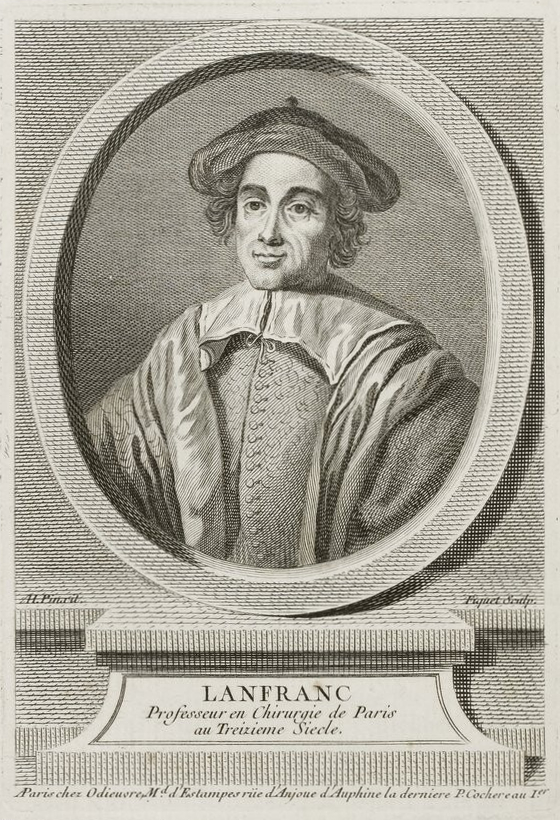
- Born: Guido Lanfranchi c. 1250; Milan
- Died: 1315

Lanfranc of Milan (c. 1250–1315), variously called Guido Lanfranchi, Lanfranco or Alanfrancus, was an Italian cleric, surgeon who set up practice in France. Lanfranc was appointed personal physician to Philip IV of France and in 1296 published a thesis on surgery under the title Chirurgia Magna, the same title as a later work published by Guy de Chauliac, Chirurgia Magna.

As author Lanfranc of Milan came to be regarded as member of the 13th century Italian rational surgery school.

== Education and career ==
Born in mid 13th century Milan, Lanfranc was trained in surgery by Guglielmo da Saliceto in Bologna. To escape the Guelphs and Ghibellines feud, Lanfranc left his practice in Milan and moved first to Lyon and then to Paris where he settled around 1295. Lanfranc found employment as surgery lecturer at the Collège de St. Côme, which Louis IX of France had built to elevate the status of surgeons in the medical profession. Surgeons trained at the college were no longer barber surgeons but were not admitted to the medical faculty.

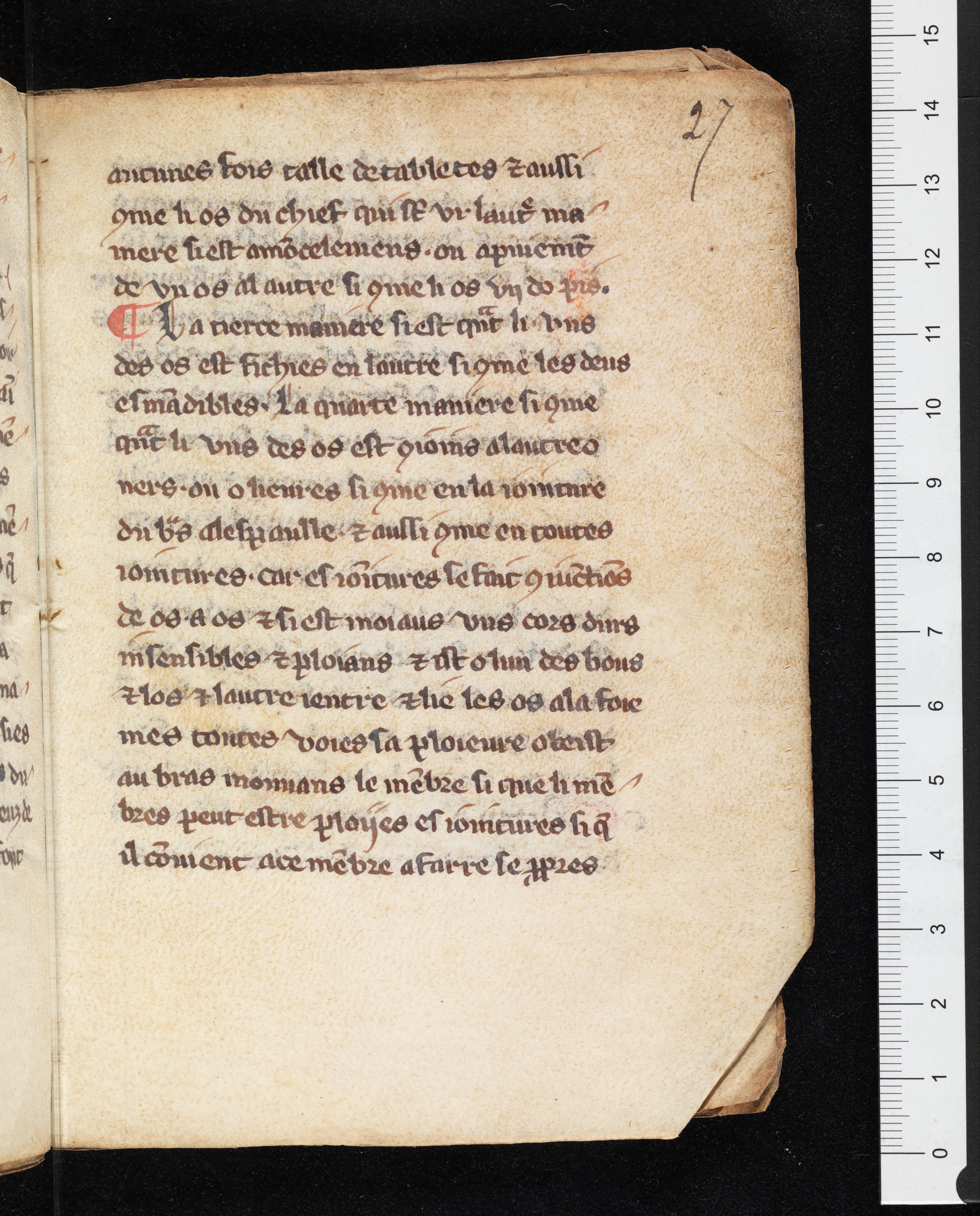
A 14th century French translation of Lanfranc's thesis, published as small-format booklet.

Lanfranc was appointed personal physician to Philip IV of France and in 1296 Lanfranc completed the Chirurgia Magna, dedicating it to Philip IV. In the book Lanfranc detailed cerebral concussion as well as skull fracture, setting out when surgical intervention was necessary. Lanfranc argued that theory makes for better surgery and elevated surgery from a craft to a science because a surgeon required knowledge of medical theory.

Surgery started to be taught at universities training physicians, thus Lanfranc had been asked by the dean of the surgery faculty at Collège de St. Côme to write down his knowledge for publication. Besides setting out the necessary knowledge of anatomy Lanfranc documented his practical experience in treating ulcers, fistulae, fractures and dislocated joints. Chirurgia Magna became accepted as comprehensive guide to medical knowledge. Among Parisian professors and lecturers Lanfranc was noted for promoting cleanliness in surgery, instead of encouraging the accumulation of pus in the body of a patient. Lanfranc became known as the father of French surgery. He died 1315.

== Legacy ==
Lanfranc had put rational surgical intervention on a par with medicine prescribed by physicians. In 1314 Henri de Mondeville published his Latin thesis Chirurgia in which he relied on the arguments of Lanfranc to position surgery as medicine. Lanfranc's treatise on surgery Chirurgia Magna, also known as the Science of Chirgurie or Cirgurie to distinguish it from the Inventarium, and other manuscripts on what was regarded to be rational surgery were in the 14th century translated into English and were eagerly read in England as surgery textbooks. In the English translations of Chirurgia Magna the practical advice passed on by Lanfranc was given more room than the theoretical knowledge Lanfranc had also cared to impart. The Chirurgia Magna was republished as book in over seventy editions and translated into multiple languages from 1490 onward. Lanfranc is remembered in the English surgery profession for recommending in the Chirurgia Magna bloodletting to treat localized pain, such as a migriane.
