= Muiris mac Donnchadh Ulltach Ó Duinnshléibhe =

Irish cleric

Muiris mac Donnchadh Ulltach Ó Duinnshléibhe (fl. 1602-1630s), anglicised Maurice MacDonough Ultach Donlevy, also known as Muiris Ulltach, was an Irish Franciscan cleric.

== Background ==
Ó Duinnshléibhe was born in the sixteenth century to a father named Donnchadh. He was born into the Ó Duinnshléibhe family, a hereditary medical family of physicians to the O'Donnells, based in County Donegal. Some members of the family went by the surname Ultach, named after the over-kingdom Ulaid, of which they were formerly the ruling dynasty.

The Annals of the Four Masters describe him as "a poor friar of the order of St. Francis" from the convent of Donegal's monastery.

== Death of O'Donnell ==
After the Irish defeat at the Battle of Kinsale, the O'Donnell clan left Ireland for Spain. In September 1602, Ó Duinnshléibhe attended clan chief Hugh Roe O'Donnell on his death bed in Simancas Castle, Spain. Also attending were O'Donnell's spiritual adviser, Fláithrí Ó Maolchonaire (future Archbishop of Tuam) and the similarly-named Father Muiris mac Seaán Ulltach Ó Duinnshléibhe.

== Contributions to Annals ==
In the 1630s, both Ó Duinnshléibhe and Muiris mac Seaán Ulltach Ó Duinnshléibhe were attached to the Franciscan convent at Bundrowes, and became acquainted with chronicler Mícheál Ó Cléirigh, who was then compiling the Annals of the Four Masters. Ó Duinnshléibhe's recollections of events, including the death of O'Donnell, were incorporated into the compilation.

== See also ==
- Donnchadh mac Eoghan Ó Duinnshléibhe, died 1527.
- Muiris mac Seaán Ulltach Ó Duinnshléibhe, Irish cleric, fl. 1602-1630s.

== Bibliography ==
- The Annals of the Four Masters: Irish history, kingship and society in the early seventeenth century, p. 39, 186–7, 246, Bernadette Cunningham, Four Courts Press, 2010. ISBN 978-1-84682-203-2.
