= Nial O'Glacan =

Irish physician (c. 1563 – 1653)

Niall Ó Glacáin
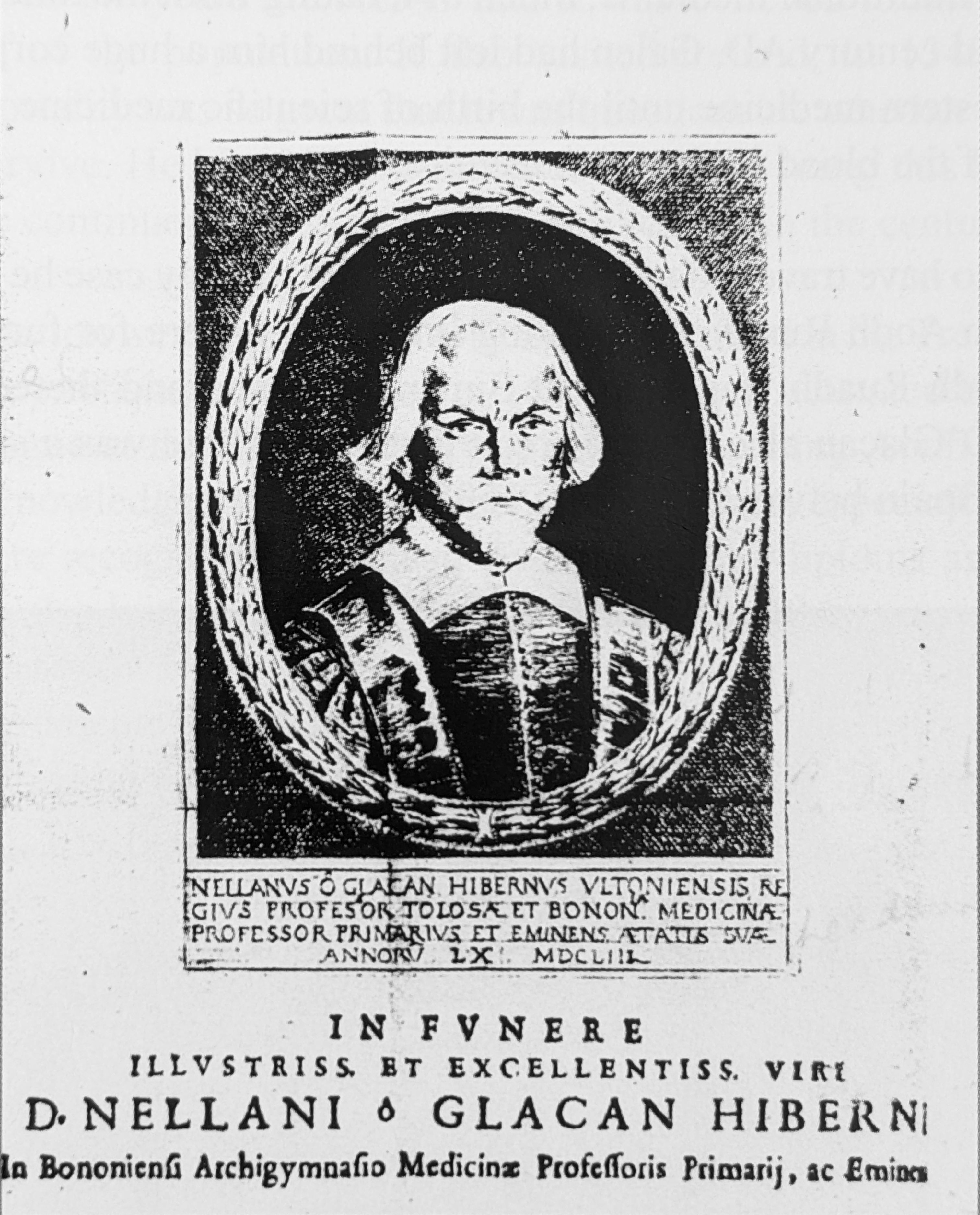
- Engraving of Ó Glacáin, 1653
- Born: c. 1563; Tyrconnell, Ireland (modern-day County Donegal)
- Died: 1653 (aged 90); Bologna, Papal States
- Occupation: Physician
- Years active: 1602–1653

Nial O'Glacan (Irish: Niall Ó Glacáin; c. 1563 – 1653) was an Irish physician and plague doctor who worked to treat victims of bubonic plague outbreaks throughout continental Europe. He was a physician to Hugh Roe O'Donnell and King Louis XIII.

Working as a physician to the prominent O'Donnell clan during the Nine Years' War, he may have followed their chief to Spain after the Siege of Kinsale, where he spent two decades practicing medicine. He moved to France in the 1620s, settling in Toulouse to publish his work Tractatus de Peste, a treatise on plague treatment. Later in life he took up a post at the University of Bologna as Professor of Medicine.

O'Glacan was a pioneer in pathological anatomy, with his work predating that of anatomist Giovanni Battista Morgagni by several decades.

== Early life and education ==
Nial O'Glacan (Note: His name is most commonly anglicised Nial O'Glacan. Other anglicisations include Neil O'Glacan and Neal Glacan. Latinisations of his name include Nellanus Glacanus, Nellus Glacanus, Nellanius Glacanus, Nellano Glacan and Nellani Ó Glacan.) was born in Tyrconnell, a Gaelic kingdom in Ireland, in the latter half of the sixteenth century. Some historians give him a birth date of around 1563, owing to a 1653 engraving that gives his age as 90. Professor Giorgio Scharpes estimated O'Glacan to be about 48 when recommending him to the University of Bologna in the 1630s, which would mean he was born in the 1580s. Moreso, The Dictionary of Ulster Biography estimates O'Glacan's birthdate as 1590, and other historians estimate it as 1600, though Conall MacCuinneagáin has pointed out that as O'Glacan treated Hugh Roe O'Donnell in 1602, these birthdates are unlikely.

O'Glacan's medical education was founded on the works of Greek physicians Galen and Hippocrates, whom he refers to in his later works. He probably received his early education from the local Donlevy family, a family of physicians. At the time, most medical families were attached to a powerful clan—the Donlevys were the personal physicians of Tyrconnell's ruling O'Donnell clan. Conversely, Charles Cameron suggests O'Glacan received his medical education abroad.

Owen Ultach MacDonlevy—the last-recorded ollam leighis (official physician) of the O'Donnells—died in 1586. By the early 1600s, it is clear O'Glacan was working as the O'Donnells' physician.

== Spain and France ==
After the Irish confederacy's defeat at the Battle of Kinsale, clan chief Hugh Roe O'Donnell travelled to Spain to secure reinforcements. Historians Kate Newmann and David Murphy have suggested that O'Glacan left Ireland after the defeat at Kinsale, due to his support for O'Donnell. O'Donnell fell ill at Simancas and was treated by O'Glacan for a bubonic plague sore at the Spanish court. During this time O'Glacan also assisted ill citizens of Madrid—there was a major bubonic plague outbreak in Spain from 1595 to 1602. O'Donnell died at Simancas in 1602, and O'Glacan subsequently spent many years practicing medicine in Salamanca. In 1622, he moved to Valencia for two years.

In 1621, O'Glacan attended the Irish College in Bordeaux under Archbishop François d'Escoubleau de Sourdis. In July 1625, he graduated from the University of Cahors (later part of the University of Toulouse) with a bachelor's degree of medicine. It is also possible O'Glacan attended the Irish College in Toulouse, Bordeaux's sister school.

Around 1628, he worked as a travelling plague doctor, treating victims at local hospitals in towns such as Fons, Figeac, Capdenac, Cajarc, Rouergue and Floyeac. His work was encouraged by the Bishop of Cahors. He had settled in Toulouse in time to treat victims of the plague outbreak of 1628. MacCuinneagáin states that O'Glacan "gained high esteem and general consideration because of the devotion which he showed in braving the contagion to succor the sick. He was appointed physician at the xenodochium pestiferorum, the plague hospital at Toulouse in 1628". O'Glacan became a member of the University of Toulouse's faculty on 31 May 1630, with the title Premier Professor of Medicine. As a professor at the university, O'Glacan was entitled to a seat in the States Assembly of the province.

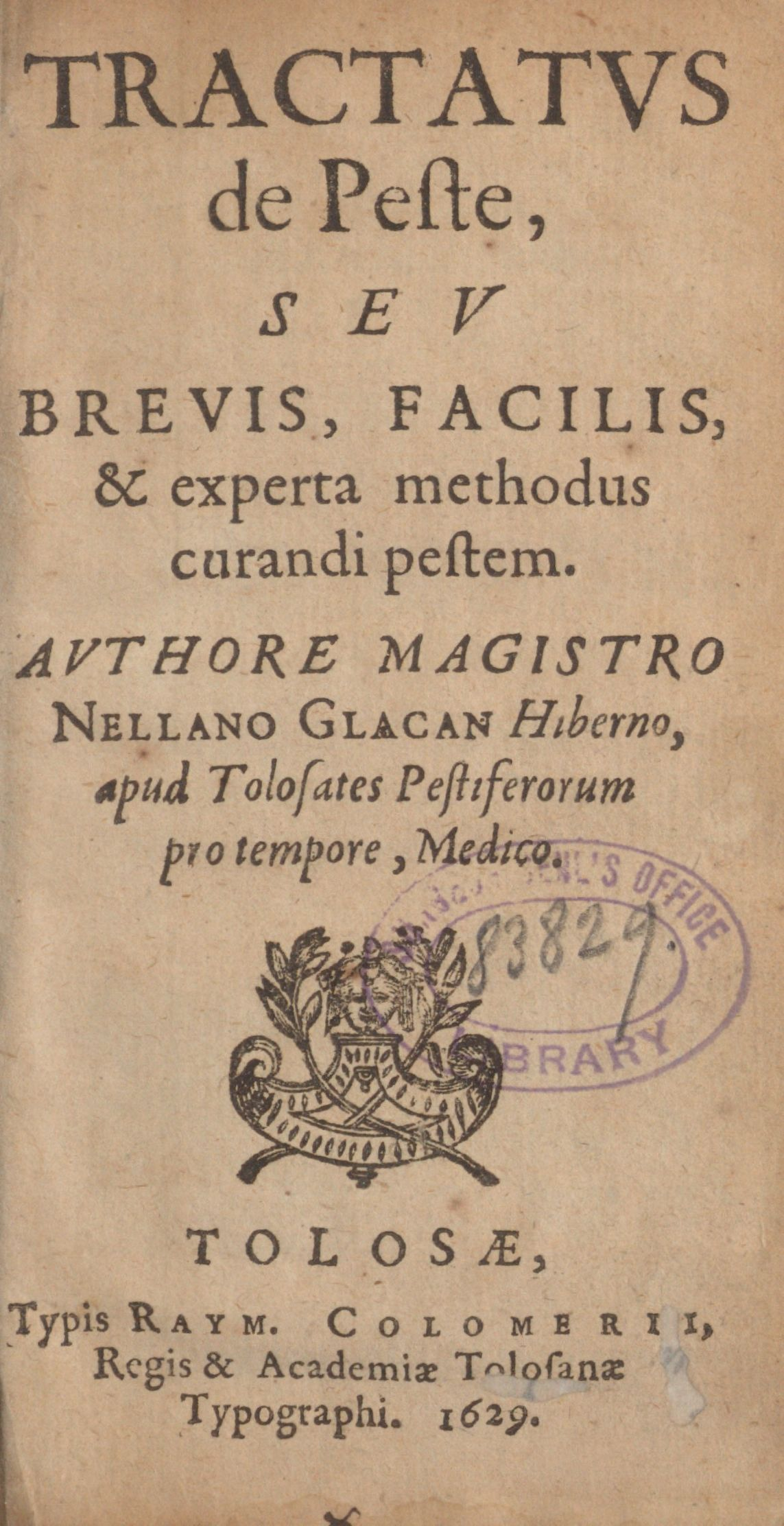
Title page of Tractatus De Peste

O'Glacan also spent time in Paris as both physician and Privy Councillor to King Louis XIII. He was appointed as Louis' physician in 1629, and had impressed the King to the extent that he was made a Privy Councillor around 1630.

== Tractatus de Peste ==
By now a respected authority on plague treatment, O'Glacan published his most famous work, Tractatus de Peste, Seu Brevis, Facilis et Experta Methodus Curandi Pestem ('A Treatise on Plague, or A Short, Easy, and Expert Method for the Curing of Plague'), at Toulouse in May 1629. It contained his descriptions of the plague and its various effects on different patients such as buboes, rashes, headaches, vomiting and coma. Suggested treatments including bloodletting, the use of enema and laxatives, and the fumigation of miasma. O'Glacan describes conducting four postmortems where he noted the occurrence of petechial haemorrhages which "covered the surface of the victims' lungs and also the swelling of the spleen".

== Bologna ==
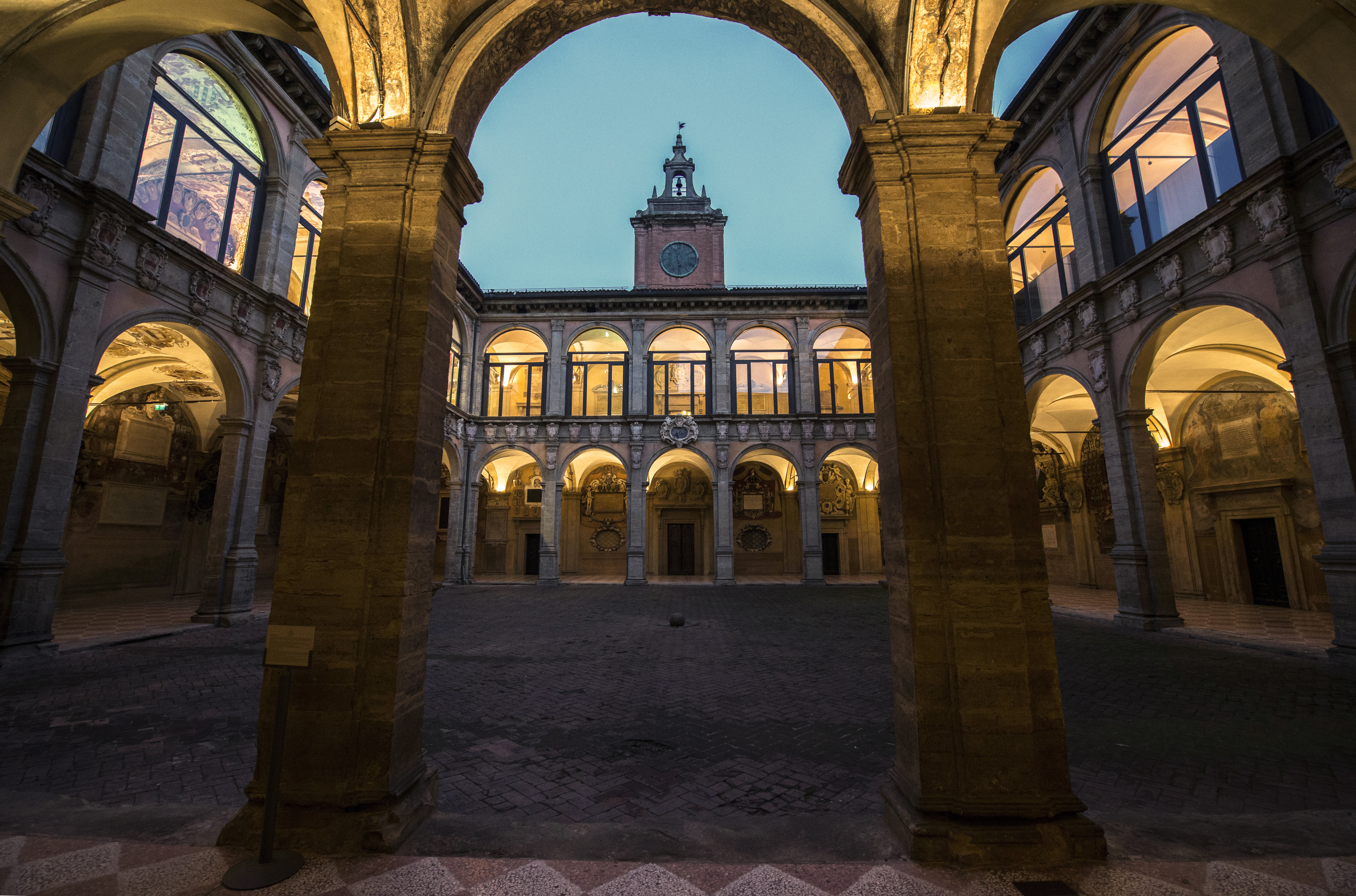
The Archiginnasio Palace, main seat of the University of Bologna in 1563

O'Glacan eventually moved to Italy. He was "head-hunted" by the Faculty of Medicine at the University of Bologna, which had a tradition of employing very eminent foreign doctors as their Medicina Sopraordinaria (Professor of Medicine). To this end, the university's senate asked Giorgio Scharpes (Professor of Medicine, 1634–1637) to write a report on O'Glacan, whose fame by then spanned all of Europe. Scharpes's reply was as follows:

With regard to religion Mr. O'Glacan is a Catholic, and there is no doubt because it would be difficult for a heretic to live in a city like [Toulouse] which is known to be one of the most Catholic places and where they cannot bear heretics. Mr. O'Glacan is about 48. He is famous because during the plague in these regions of France during the years 1627 to 1629 he was very helpful and in the year 1629 he produced a book whose title is Tractatus de Peste ... and I invite you to read this book to understand exactly why Mr. O'Glacan is valuable and why he is still teaching in the University of Tolosa ... About his teaching he is well estimated because he is a good philosopher, good in fighting against his enemies that accused him of being a magician; his book can confirm that he was not a magician ... Mr. O'Glacan knows Greek very well ... he says he would really like to serve the University of Bologna, I can understand that there will not be any problem for the salary and for him to come.

In 1646, O'Glacan became Professor of Medicine at the University of Bologna. He held this office until his death.

During his years in Bologna, O'Glacan wrote his final work, Cursus Medicus ('A Physician's Course'), which was published in three volumes in 1655. The first volume dealt with physiology, the second pathology, and the third—published after his death—on the theory of signs. This final volume dealt with the different diagnosis by doctors, descriptions of diseases, and was overall an introduction to the modern concept of differential diagnosis. Two Irish residents of Bologna, Gregory Fallon and Jesuit Phillip Roche, wrote commendatory verses prefixing the second volume.

== Personal life ==
Although the details of O'Glacan's personal life are almost unknown, many of his associates are referenced in contemporary records. He entertained Bishop of Ferns Nicholas French and Sir Nicholas Plunkett at his home in Bologna, when the latter were on their way to Rome in 1648. In collaboration with them, he wrote eulogistic poems in Latin to Pope Innocent X, titled Regni Hiberniae ad Sanctissimi Innocenti Pont. Max. Pyramides Encomiasticae. O'Glacan himself visited Rome at some point.

In these poems, he mentions another friend, the Franciscan catechist and grammarian Froinsias Ó Maolmhuaidh. O'Glacan was also an associate of Irish bishop Peter Talbot and Portuguese physician Gabriel da Fonseca, personal physician to Innocent X. Other friends in Italy include Gerard O'Fearail and John O'Fahy.

== Death and legacy ==
O'Glacan died in Bologna in 1653, (Note: David Murphy and Kate Newmann have suggested later death dates. Brenda O'Hanrahan stated that "Neal Glacan died in Bologna on 1 May 1643, survived by his widow Giovanna. He had been lecturing at the Studio up to the time of his death".) The final volume of Cursus Medicus begins with his eulogy, as written by Peter von Adrian Brocke, Professor of Eloquence at Lucca:

With healing art he arms us to repel, dire troops of agues and of fevers fell, whatever ills the patient may endure, known or unknown, unerring is his cure..."

== Bibliography ==
- Tractatus de Peste, Seu Brevis, Facilis et Experta Methodus Curandi Pestem, University of Toulouse Press, 1629.
- Cursus Medicus, libris tredecem propositus, Vol 1, Vol 2, Vol 3, University of Bologna press, 1655.
