= Cormac Mac Duinnshléibhe =

Irish physician and scribe

Cormac Mac Duinnshléibhe (anglicized as Cormac MacDonlevy, fl. c. 1460.) was an Irish physician and scribe. He was an influential medieval Irish physician and medical scholar of the Arabian school and was educated at universities in Continental Europe.

He is famed for advancing Irish mediaeval medical practice by translating, for the first time, seminal Continental European medical texts from Latin to the vernacular. His translations provided the maojrity of Irish physicians, who were exclusively Irish-speaking and normally hereditarily, with their first access to refer to those texts.

== Background ==
Cormac was descended from the Donlevy, who were the last ruling dynasty of the over-kingdom of Ulaid. They migrated to the kingdom of Tyrconnell and became hereditary chief physicians to its rulers, the Ó Domhnaill clan.

He held a bachelor of physic although the medical school or university from which he graduated is unknown.

== Works ==
He was notable for being a prolific translator, creating and consolidating Irish medical, anatomical, pharmaceutical and botanical terms.

In 1459, in Cloyne, County Cork, he translated De Dosibus Medicarum by Walter de Agilon.

In or about 1470, Cormac MacDonlevy, M.B. commenced the twelve-year task of first translating the French physician Bernard of Gordon's extensive medical work, the Lilium medicine (1320), from Latin to Irish. Thereafter, as it had some 150 years earlier with the Continental European medical community, the monumental Lilium medicine (English: "Lily of Medicine") achieved great popularity among the medical community of the Celtic nations. Excerpts were included in the Catalogue of the Irish Manuscripts in the British Museum by Standish Hayes O'Grady and Robin Flower.

Cormac, also, first translated Gordon's De pronosticis (c. 1295) and Gaulteris Agilon's De dosibus (c. 1250) from Latin into Irish. Gaulteris' De dosibus, a pharmaceutical tract and well-used historical source, provides a concise introduction to the basic principles and operations of mediaeval European pharmacy. Cormac too first translated from Latin to Irish the French physician and surgeon Guy de Chauliac's Chirurgia magna, a major surgical text (c. 1363), as well as other major Continental European medical texts.

He also translated Gordon's De decem ingeniis curandorum morborum (1299).
