= Chirurgia magna =

1363 medical book by Guy de Chauliac

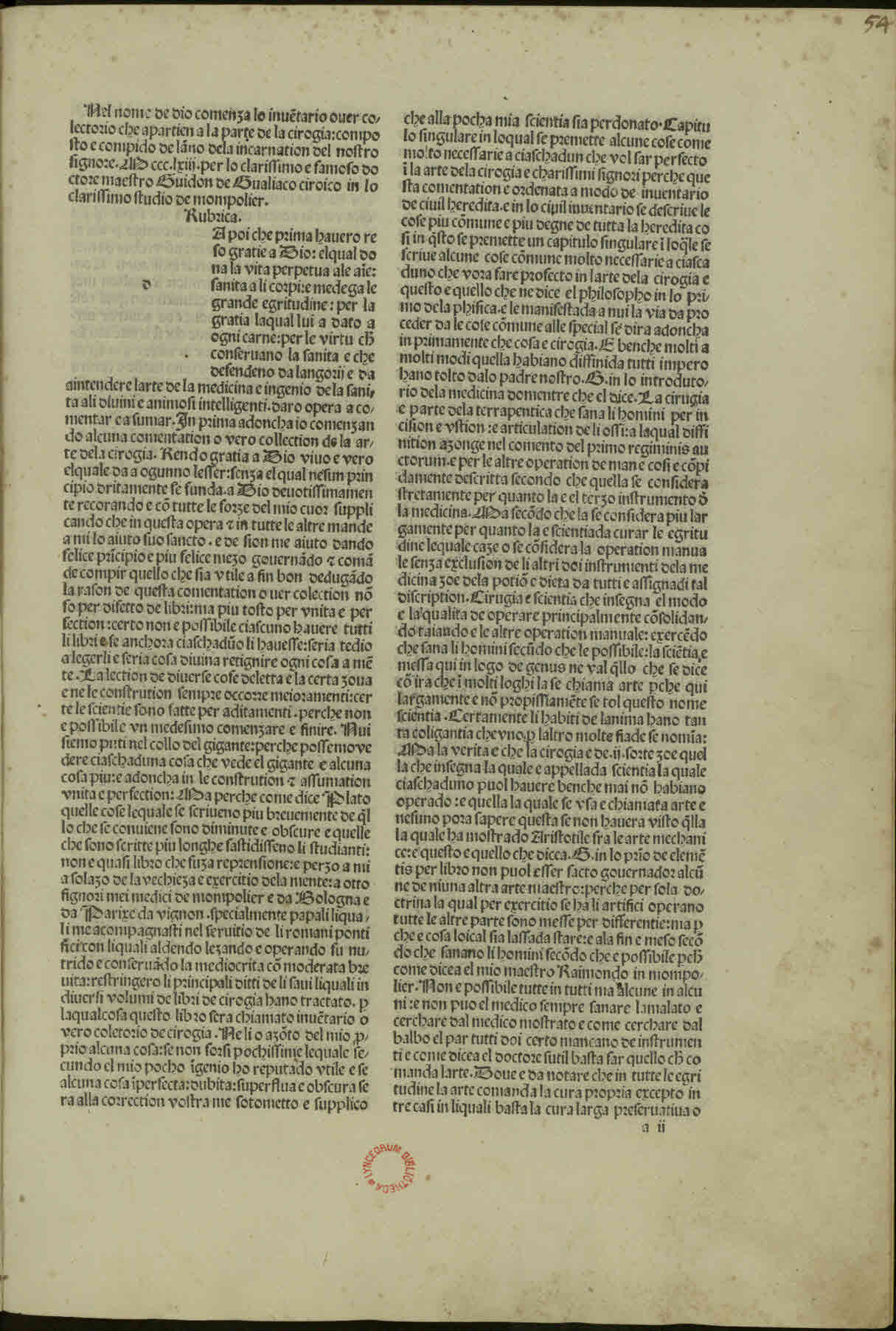
Chirurgia, 1493

Chirurgia magna (Latin for "Great [work on] Surgery"), fully titled the Inventarium sive chirurgia magna (Latin for "The Inventory, or the Great [work on] Surgery"), is a guide to surgery and practical medicine completed in 1363. Guy de Chauliac, Pope Clement VI's attending physician, compiled the information from his own field experience and research of historical medical texts. The original text is in Latin and comprises 465 pages. It was translated into various European languages: the version in Middle English has been published. This work became one of the most important reference manuals of practical medicine for the next three centuries. It was translated into Irish by Cormac Mac Duinnshléibhe.

The physician and bibliophile Tibulle Desbarreaux-Bernard (1798–1880) believed that the Chirurgia magna was originally written in Catalan at the medical school in Montpellier and that the extant Latin text is an early translation.

A modern edition of the Latin text, with commentary on sources, has been printed.
