= Muiris mac Seaán Ulltach Ó Duinnshléibhe =

Muiris mac Seaán Ulltach Ó Duinnshléibhe, aka Father Muiris Ulltach, fl. 1602-1630s.

== Spain ==
Ó Duinnshléibhe was one of two Donegal men named Father Muiris Ulltach who attended Aodh Ruadh Ó Domhnaill (d. 1602) on his death-bed in Simancas Castle, Spain, with Archbishop of Tuam Fláithrí Ó Maol Chonaire.

== Translator ==
In the 1620s, Ó Duinnshléibhe translated Francis O'Mahony's Brevis synopsis Provinciae Hyberniae FF Minorum into Irish. This version was later made available to Mícheál Ó Cléirigh and his co-workers for the Annals of the Four Masters. In 1641, Ó Cléirigh wrote that

- And Fr. Muiris Ulltach mac Seaáin, who was a long-time guardian of Donegal, translated the same into Irish.

== Bundrowes ==
As Ó Cléirigh indicated, Ó Duinnshléibhe was guardian of the Franciscan convent at Bundrowes, County Donegal, from 1632 to 1635. In 1624, he

- understood that Ireland's saints had been composed arcanely by the holy bishop ... he requested the Fr Provincial who was in that same convent of Donegal (he was by name also another Muiris Ulltach) to prevail upon ... Cú Choigcríche son of Diarmaid Ó Cléirigh who was well versed in Irish and who had some of the old books required for this task to put the saints in the order in which they now are after the manner of the Roman Martyrology as they themselves instructed.
