= Griffin =

Legendary animal

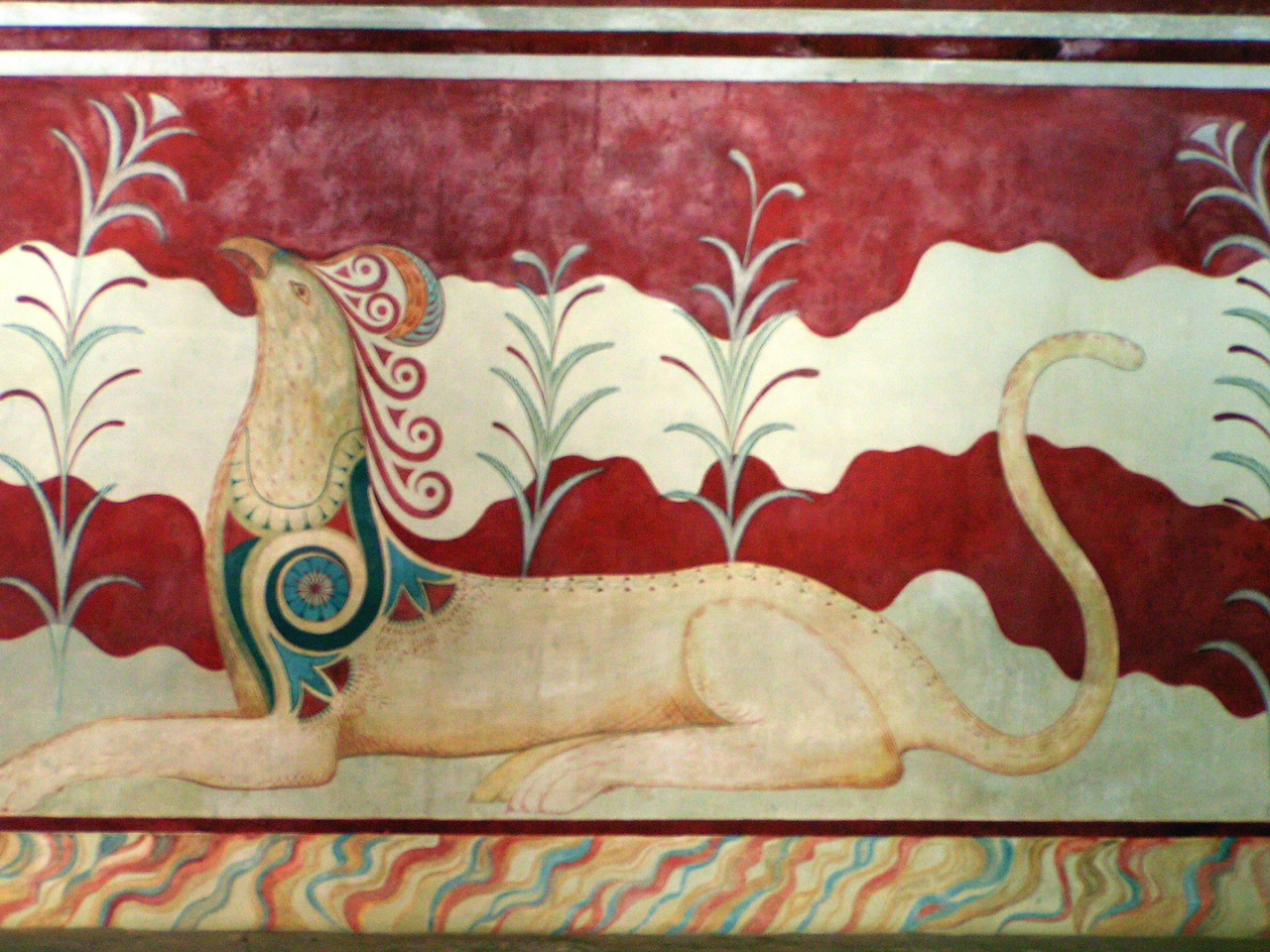
- Restored griffin fresco in the Throne Room, Palace of Knossos, Crete, an original from the Bronze Age

Creature information
- Other name(s): Axex, Opinici, Keythong
- Grouping: Mythical creature
- Similar entities: Akhekh, Hippogriff, Sphinx, Simurgh
- Folklore: Greece, Ancient Iran, Armenia, Ancient Egypt, Ancient Mesopotamia

The griffin, griffon, or gryphon (Ancient Greek: γρύψ, romanized: grýps; Classical Latin: gryps or grypus; Late and Medieval Latin: gryphes, grypho etc.; Old French: griffon) is a legendary creature with the body, tail, and back legs of a lion, and the head and wings of an eagle with its talons on the front legs.

In Greek and Roman texts, griffins and Arimaspians were associated with the gold deposits of Central Asia. The earliest classical writings on the topic were derived from Aristeas (7th century BC) and preserved by Herodotus and Aeschylus (mid 5th century BC).

== Overview ==
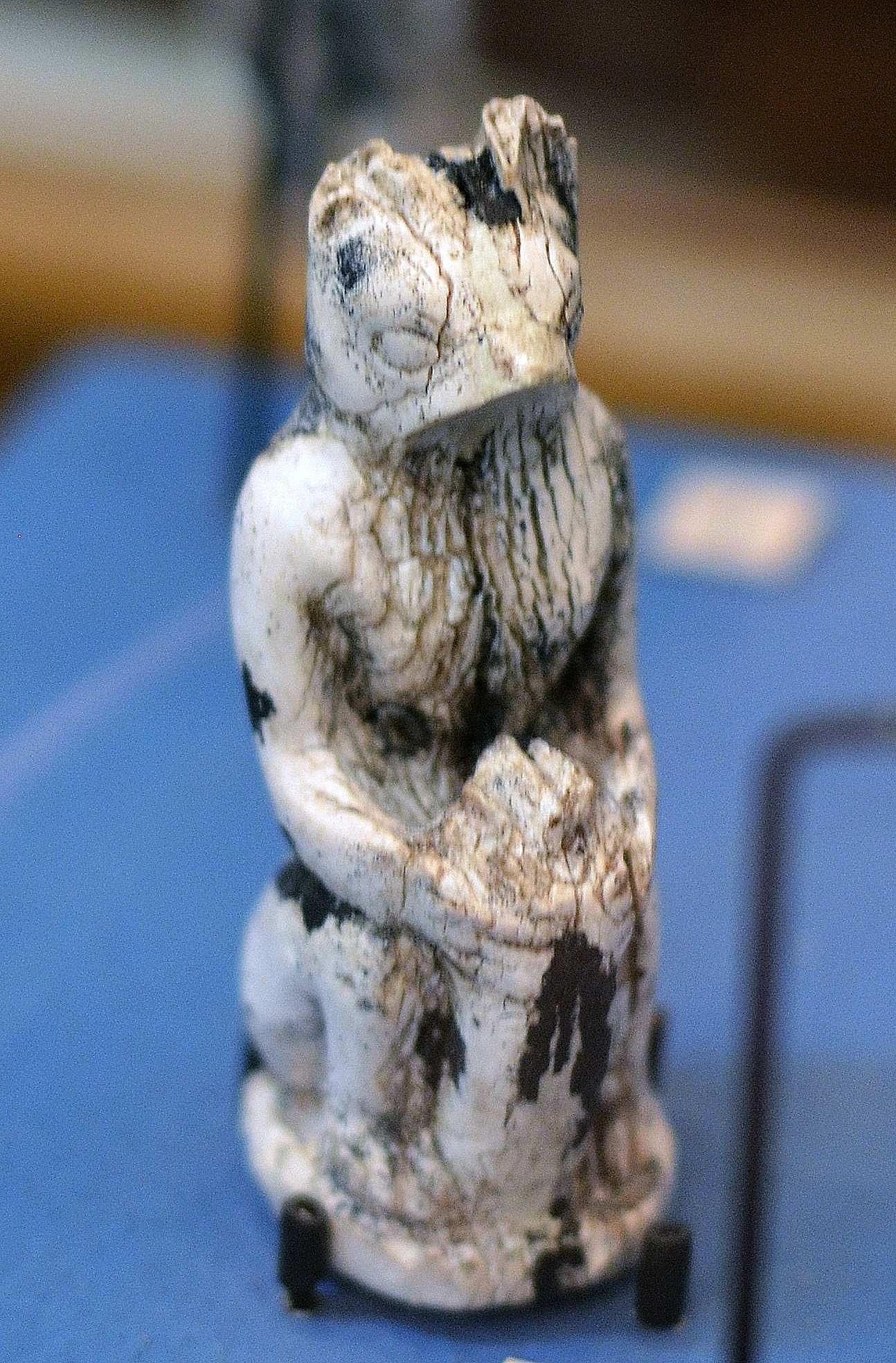
Falcon-headed feline predator or "griffin". End of Dynasty 0, c. 3000 BC, Western Kom, Tell el-Farkha, Egypt.

Because the lion was traditionally considered the king of the beasts and the eagle the king of the birds, by the Middle Ages, the griffin was thought to be an especially powerful and majestic creature. Since classical antiquity, griffins were known for guarding treasures and priceless possessions.

In the Greek and Roman texts, the griffins and the Arimaspians were associated with gold deposits of Central Asia. The earliest classical writings were derived from Aristeas (7th cent. BC) and preserved by Herodotus and Aeschylus (mid 5th century BC), but the physical descriptions are not very explicit and from Herodotus to Aelian imply that griffins were creatures seen and known through artworks. Even though they are sharp-beaked, their being likened to "unbarking hounds of Zeus" has led to the speculation they were seen as wingless.

Pliny the Elder (1st century) was the first to state explicitly that griffins were winged and long eared. But Apollonius of Tyana wrote that griffins did not have true bird wings, but membranous webbed feet that only gave them the capability of short-distanced flight. Writers after Aelian (3rd century AD) did not add much new material to griffin lore, except for the later idea that griffins deposited agate stone among the eggs in their nest.

Pliny placed the griffins in Æthiopia and Ctesias (5th century BC) in greater India. Scholars have observed that legends about the gold-digging ants of India may have contaminated griffin lore.

In the Christian era, Isidore of Seville (7th century AD) wrote that griffins were a great enemy of horses. This notion may have developed from the tradition that horseback-riding Arimaspians raided the griffin gold.

== Nomenclature ==
=== Etymology ===
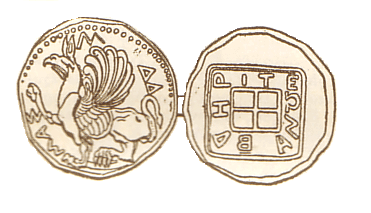
Griffin depicted on obverse side of coin. —Silver tetradrachm. Abdera (c. 450–430BC). (Note: Abdera minted coins since it was founded in 544 BC as a colony of Teos, which also used the griffin motif.)

The derivation of this word remains uncertain. It could be related to the Greek word γρυπός (grypos), meaning 'curved', or 'hooked'. Greek γρύφ (gryph) from γρύφ 'hook-nosed' is suggested.

It could also have been an Anatolian loan word derived from a Semitic language; compare the Hebrew כרוב kərúv.

=== Persian names ===
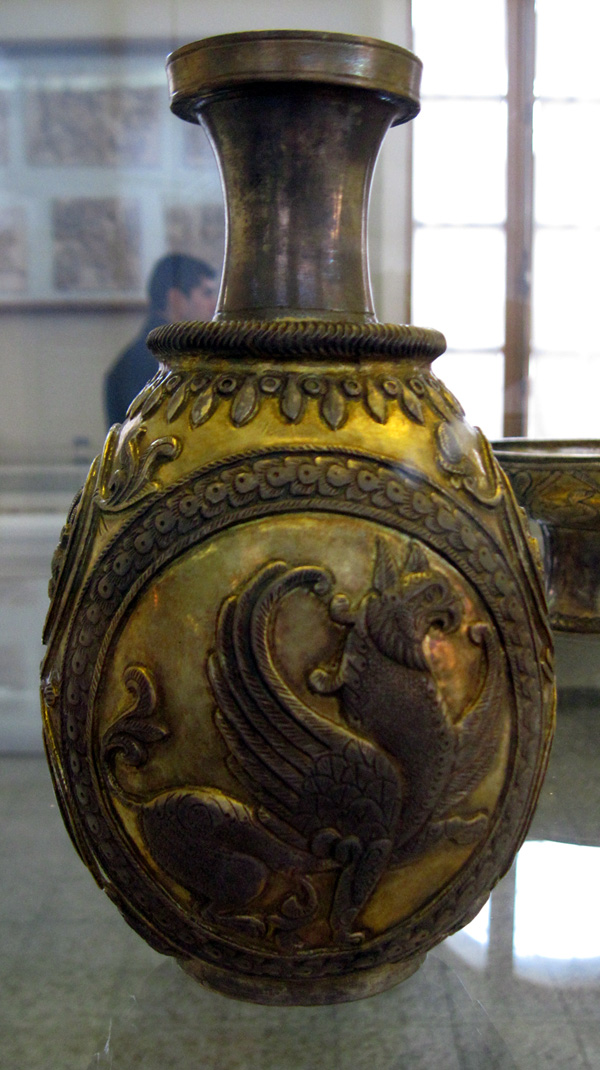
Shirdal on the silver cup, Iranian Art.

In the modern Persian language, the griffin has come to be called šērdāl (Persian: شیردال), meaning 'lion-eagle'. However, the practice of referring to ancient Iranian griffin objects or monuments as sherdal, is not followed by other current archaeological scholarship (e.g., here).

Possible Old or Middle Iranian names for the creature have been discussed. Middle Persian Sēnmurw in Sasanian culture was a fabulous composite creature, and Russian archaeologist Boris A. Litvinskij argued for the possibility that the application of this term may extend to the griffin. The term Sēnmurw is recognized as the etymological ancestor of simurgh, which is generally regarded as a mythological bird (rather than a composite) in later medieval Persian literature, (Note: Also, Sēnmurw etymological root was Avestan mərəγō saēnō (marəya saēna) which also denoted a bird (falcon or eagle), and not a composite, as conceded by Litvinskij.) though some argue that this bird may have originated from the Mesopotamian lion-griffin. (Note: Harper, P. O. (1961), "The Sēnmurw", Metropolitan Museum of Art Bulletin, Series 2, 20 (3): 95–101, doi:10.2307/3257932, JSTOR 3257932 apud Schmidt.)

There is also the Armenian term Paskuč (Armenian: պասկուչ) that had been used to translate Greek gryp 'griffin' in the Septuagint, (Note: Marr, N. Ya. (1918), "Ossetica-Japhetica", Izvestiya Rossiskoi Akademii Nauk Известия Российской академии наук: 2087, n. 2 apud Schmidt.) which H. P. Schmidt characterized as the counterpart of the simurgh. However, the cognate term Baškuč (glossed as 'griffin') also occurs in Middle Persian, attested in the Zoroastrian cosmological text Bundahishn XXIV (supposedly distinguishable from Sēnmurw which also appears in the same text). Middle Persian Paškuč is also attested in Manichaean magical texts (Manichaean Middle Persian: pškwc), and this must have meant a "griffin or a monster like a griffin" according to W. B. Henning.

=== Egyptian names ===
The griffin was given names which were descriptive epithets, such as tštš (Note: tštš: t S t S The "š" glyph seems to be 𓈚 rathe than 𓈙 and are thus superposed in Leibovitch's inline text; however the glyps are juxtaposed and seemingly the plain bar "š" is used on his Fig. 5 line sketch.) or tesh-tesh meaning "Tearer[-in-pieces]" (Note: Riefstahl (1956), p. 2 citing Leibovitch.) inscribed on a griffin image found in a tomb at Deir El Bersha; (Note: Leibovitch (1942), pp. 186–187 and Fig. 5: "tštš.. signifie déchirer, triturer, couper, metter en pièces [tštš.. denotes tearing, grind up, chopping, ripping to pieces]". Citing Griffith & Newberry (1895) El-Bersheh 2: Pl. XVI, tomb no. 5.) (Note: David glosses tštš as "Crusher", which is consistent with one of Leibovitch's several glosses.<!!-- But David note 8 indicates the source to be Newberry 1893b (Beni Hasan II), Pl. 16, which probably should by Griffith & Newberry (El-Bersheh II)0, Pl. 16-->) and sfr/srf "fiery one", attested at Beni Hasan (Note: David, citing Newberry (1893a, 1893b recte [1893], [1894]). Beni Hasan.) (compare Hebrew saráf). The descriptive epithet "Tearer" is not uniquely applied to the griffin beast, and tštš (Teš-teš) has also been used to denote the god Osiris elsewhere. (Note: The epithet "the Crusher" (or "Trampler") is also given by Riefstahl (1956), p. 2 citing Leibovitch, but the words do not actually occur as names/epithets in Leibovitch's reading of the inscription: "Spdw le seigneur des pays montagne, qui écrase (en les piétinant) Sopdu the lord of the mountain countries, who crushes (trampling them)". The inscription is from Sahure (pharaoh of Fifth Dynasty of Egypt). A relief represents Sahure as an enemy-trampling griffin in the reliefs work found in his pyramid complex.)

== Form ==
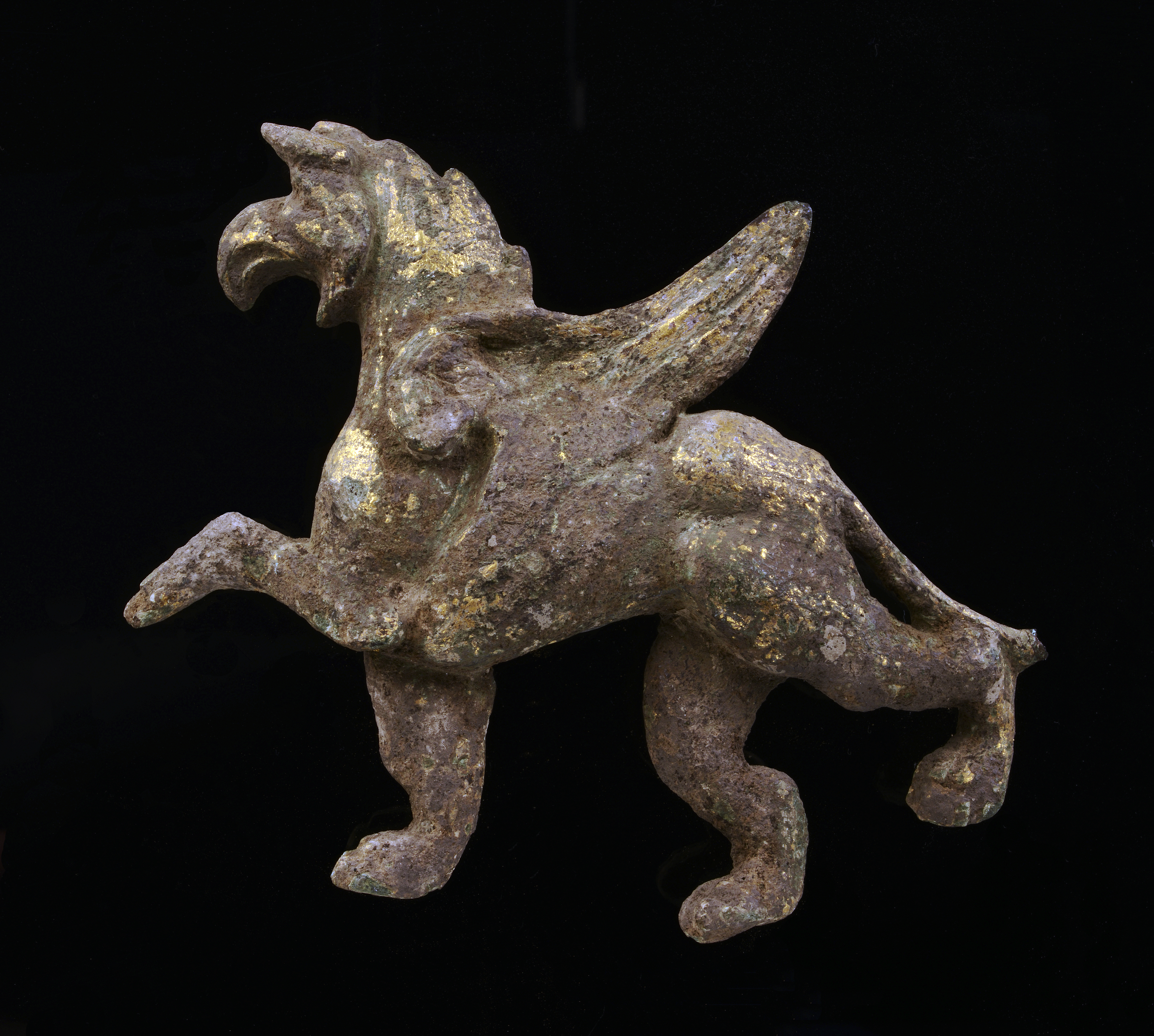
Bronze figure of a griffin, Roman period (AD 50–270)

Most statuary representations of griffins depict them with bird-like forelegs and talons, although in some older illustrations griffins have a lion's forelegs (see bronze figure, right); they generally have a lion's hindquarters. Its eagle's head is conventionally given prominent ears; these are sometimes described as the lion's ears, but are often elongated (more like a horse's), and are sometimes feathered.

=== Cauldron figurines ===
The griffin of Greece, as depicted in cast (Note: The cast pieces could also have additional hammered details. The "cast protomes" are grouped by Jantzen.) bronze cauldron protomes (cf. below), has a squat face with short beaks (Note: The beaks on the Greeks are identified as "visor" of beasts such as seen in Urartian art, by Ghirshman (1964c), p. 108.) that are open agape as if screaming, with the tongue showing. There is also a "top-knob" on its head or between the brows.

==== Tendrils ====
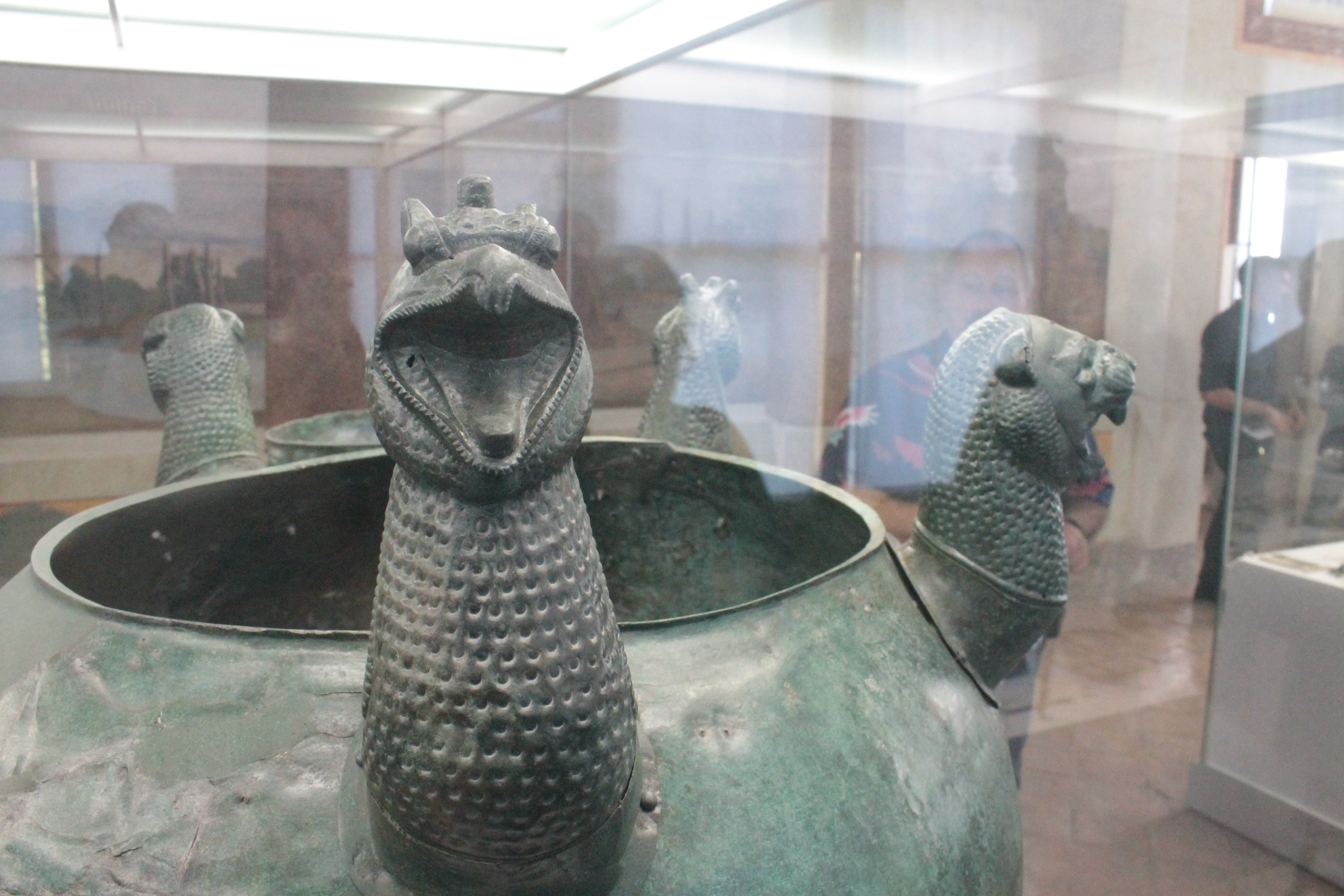
Griffins and lions on cauldron. Etruscan. —8th – 7th centuries B.C., from Barberini tomb. National Etruscan Museum of Villa Giulia, Rome.

There may also be so-called "tendrils", or curled "spiral-locks" depicted, presumably representing either hair/mane or feather/crest locks dangling down. Single- or double-streaked tendrils hang down both sides and behind the griffin's neck, carven on some of the Greek protomes. (Note: The example on figure right is the broken off head, and it is not certain whether the paired spiral-locks ran down its neck, as in other examples of griffin protomes from Olympia (Jantzen, GG no. 80, p. 20).) The tendril motif emerged at the beginning of the first millennium, BC., in various parts of the Orient. The "double spiral of hair running downwards from the base of the ear" is said to be a hallmark of Iranian (Uratrian) art. The Etruscan cauldron-griffins (e.g., from Barberini tomb, figure right (Note: See the cover photo of this cauldron in Papalexandrou (2021) and Fig. 3.2. The lateral side of the griffins are hard to see on this picture shown right; the lions do not have these hanging tresses. Cf. Fig. 3.3 for another cauldron, from the Bernardini tomb. Both are bronze cauldrons on a conical stand.) (Note: An additional example of Etruscan griffin is the one found in Vetulonia, Italy.)) also bear the "curled tresses" that are the signature of Uratrian workmanship. (Note: While Maxwell-Hyslop, thought early griffin protomes were made in the east, she regarded later Etruscan examples as being made locally, imitating the Eastern originals, but such "Vannic (Urartrians) originals" are yet to be found.) Even the ornate crests on Minoan griffins (such as the fresco of the Throne Room, figure top of page) may be a development of these curled tresses. (Note: In addition to the Throne Room, Goldman provides the following Mycenaean examples: the "ivory plaque of Mycenae" (Demargne, Pierre (1947), La Crète dédalique, fig. 24); the "gold cylinder seal from Pylos" (Blegen, Carl W. (5 December 1953). "A Royal Tomb of Homeric Times", Illustrated London News, fig. 7))

==== Top-knob ====
One prominent characteristic of the cauldron griffins is the "top-knob between the brows" (seemingly situated at the top of the head (Note: The positioning is between the brows, yet looks to be at the top of the head, as seen on the example Goldman (1960), p. 324 provides: Plate 90, fig. 1 (adapted from GG 75).)).

The top-knob feature has clear oriental origins. Jack Leonard Benson says these appendages were "topknots" subsequently rendered as "knobs" in later development of the cauldron Griffins. Benson's emphasis is that the Greeks attached a stylized "anorganic" topknot or an "inorganic" plug on the griffin's head (due to lack of information), (Note: Benson thinks using a simplified "plug" shape was the Greek "solution" to the problem of not knowing exactly what 3-dimensional shape to use, having only access to 2-dimensional renderings from the East.) while in contrast, a known oriental example (stone protomes from Nimrud) is simple but more "plausible" (naturalistic), resembling a forelock.

==== Warts ====
A cluster of "warts" between the eyes are also mentioned. (Note: Examples of GG no. 14,) One conjecture is that these derive from the bumps (furrows) on a lion's snout. Another view regards the wart as deriving from the bumpy cockscomb on a rooster or other such fowls.

== Art in antiquity ==
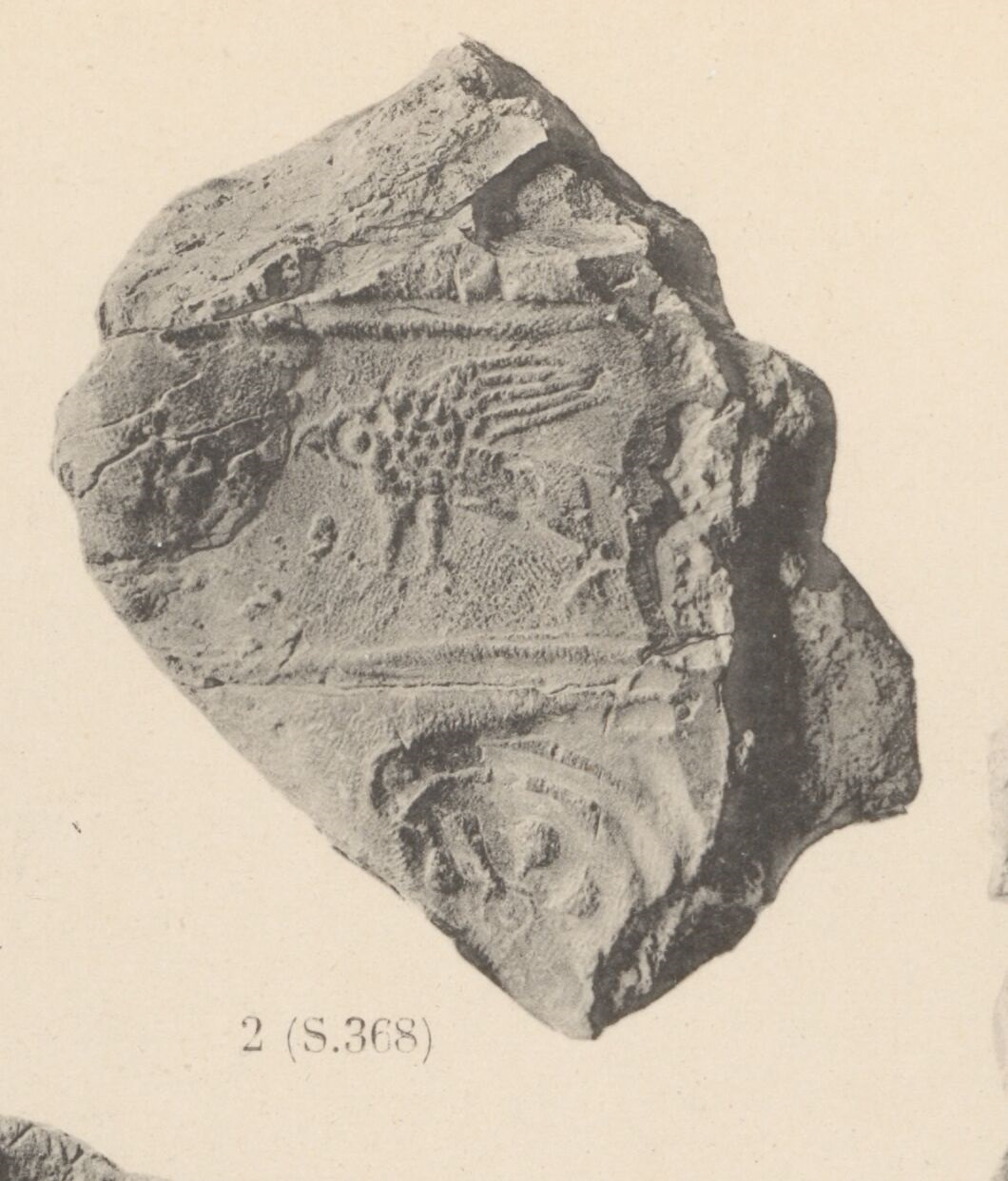
Griffin seal impression.
—Susa, Iran. 4th millennium B.C.). Louvres.

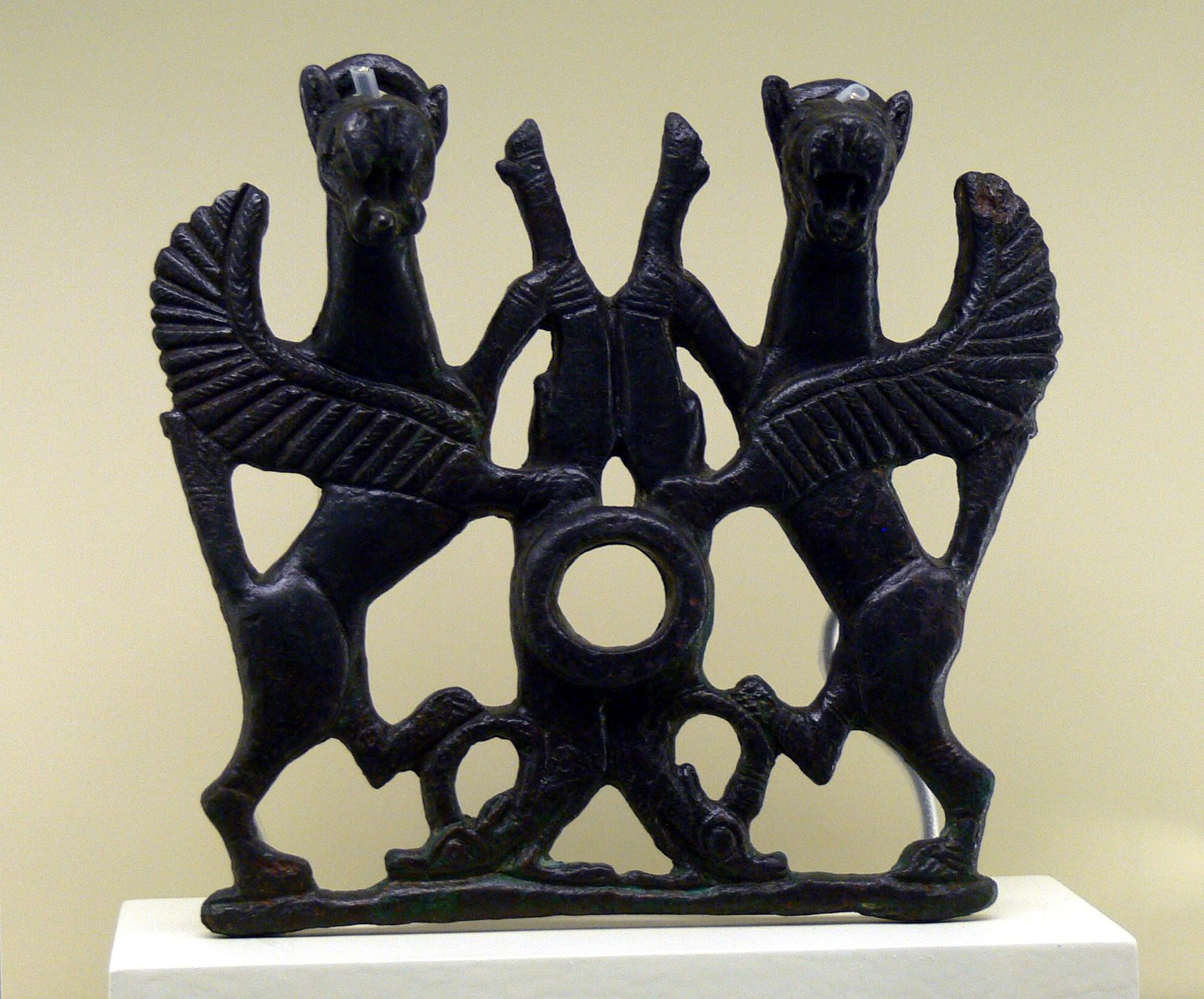
Bronze griffins from ancient Luristan, Iran, 1st millennium BC.
—Vorderasiatisches Museum Berlin

=== Mesopotamia ===
Griffin-like animals were depicted on cylinder seals in Mesopotamia c. 3000 BC, perhaps as early as the Uruk period (4000–3100BC) and subsequent Proto-Elamite (Jemdet Nasr) period. An example of a winged lion with beaks, unearthed in Susa (cf. fig. right) dates to the 4th millennium B.C., and is a unique example of a griffin-like animal with a male lion's mane. However, this monster then ceased to continue to be expressed after the Elamite culture.

What the Sumerians of the Early Dynastic period portrayed instead were winged lions, and the lion-headed eagle (Imdugud).

In the Akkadian Empire that succeeded Sumer, early examples (from early 3rd millennium BC) of lions with bird heads appeared on cylinder seals, shown pulling the chariots for its rider, the weather god. (Note: Fishbane's example from early 3rd millennium BC is a four-wheeled chariot, citing Pritchard. There is another four-wheeled chariot which generally match the description, held by the Morgan Library (shelfmark Morgan Seal 220), dated to between 2340 and 2150 BC.) (Note: Frankfort's example is a two-wheeled chariot in the seal-impression image shown on Fig. 4.) The "lion-griffin" on Akkadian seals are also shown as fire-belching, and shaggy (at the neck) in particular examples. (Note: Frankfort classed it as a "winged, tailed, and taloned dragon which spat fire".)

The bronzeworks of Luristan, the North and North West region of Iran in the Iron Age, include examples of Achaemenid art depicting both the "bird-griffin" and "lion-griffin" designs, such as are found on horse-bits. Bernard Goldman maintains the position that Luristan examples must be counted as developments of the "lion-griffin" type, even when it exhibits "stylization .. approaching the beak of a bird". The Luristan griffin-like creatures resemble and perhaps are descended from Assyrian creatures, possibly influenced by Mitannian animals, or perhaps there had been parallel development in both Assyrian and Elamite cultures.

=== Iran ===
Bird-headed mammal images appeared in art of the Achaemenian Persian Empire. Russian jewelry historian Elena Neva maintained that the Achaemenids considered the griffin "a protector from evil, witchcraft, and secret slander", but no writings exist from Achaemenid Persia to support her claim. R.L. Fox (1973) remarks that a "lion-griffin" attacks a stag in a pebble mosaic at Pella, from the 4th century BC, perhaps serving as an emblem of the kingdom of Macedon or a personal emblem of Antipater, one of Alexander's successors.

A golden frontal half of a griffin-like animal from the Ziwiye hoard (near Saqqez city) in Kurdistan province, Iran resembles the western protomes in style. (Note: Ghirshman (and others, cf. Maxwell-Hyslop (1956), p. 160, citing André Godard.) thought the Ziwiye griffin was a protome to a lost cauldron. Goldman thinks this unlikely, as the animal is posed in couchant position, and gold is too soft a metal.) They were of Urartian workmanship (neither Assyrian or Scythian), (Note: Godard, André (1950), "Le trésor de Ziwiye" at Fig. 30, considered the object a Scythinan import. Cited by Maxwell-Hyslop (1956), p. 160.) though the hoard itself may have represented a Scythian burial. The animal is described as having a "visor" (i.e., beaks) made by Urartian craftsmen, similar to what is found on Greek protomes.

=== Egypt ===
Representations of griffin-like hybrids with four legs and a beaked head appeared in Ancient Egyptian art dating back to before 3000 BC. The oldest known depiction of a griffin-like animal in Egypt appears as a relief carving on slate on the cosmetic palette from Hierakonpolis, (Note: Leibovitch (1942), pp. 184–185 and Fig 3 (detail of griffin-like beast), citing Quibell & Green (1902)) the Two Dog Palette (Note: Frankfort (1936–1937), p. 110, also citing Quibell & Green (1902)) dated to the Early Dynastic Period, c. 3300–3100 BC.

=== Near East elsewhere ===
Griffin-type creatures combining raptor heads and mammalian bodies were depicted in the Levant, Syria, and Anatolia during the Middle Bronze Age, dated at about 1950–1550 BC.

=== Greece ===
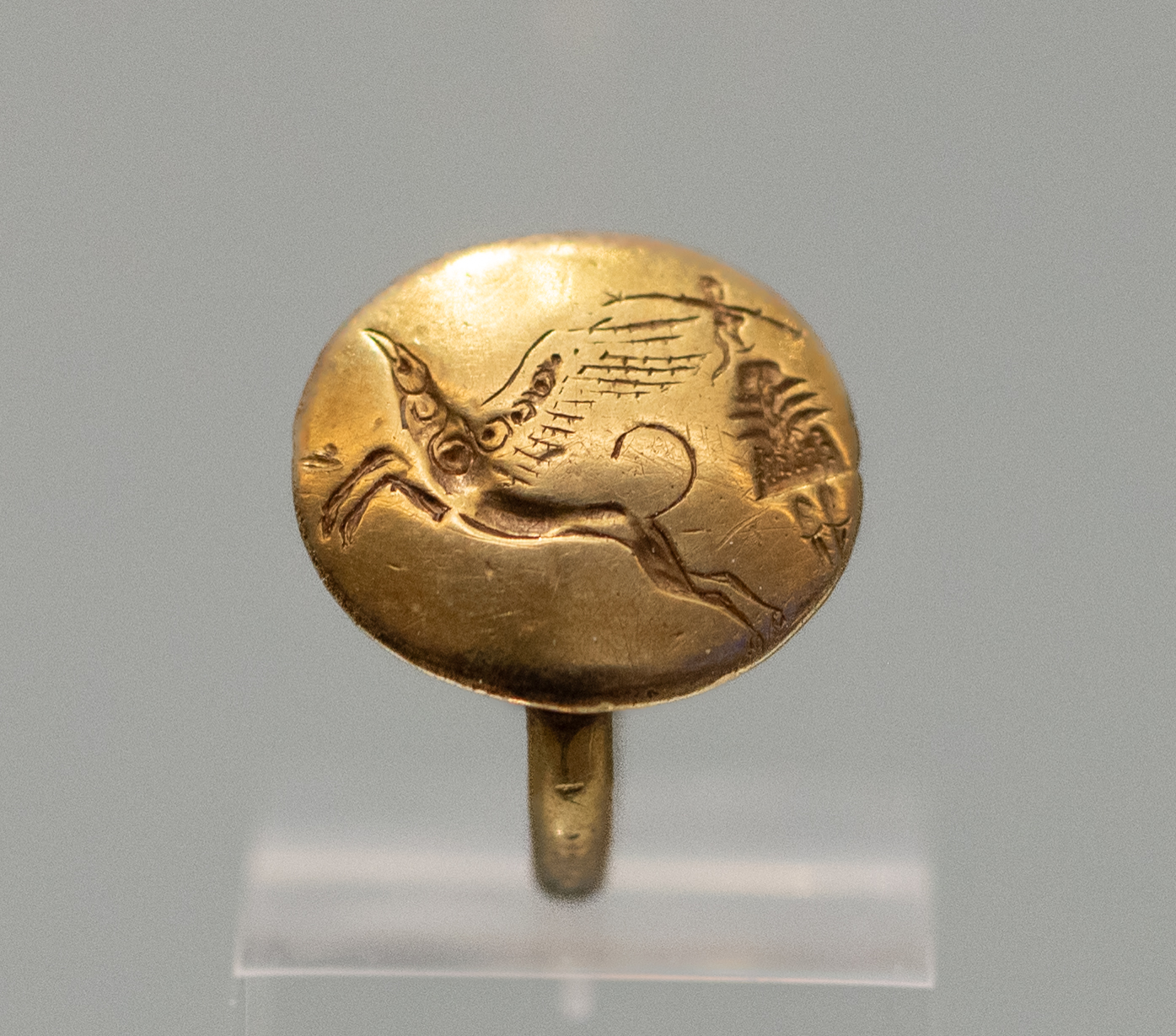
A Minoan ring with a female figure and a griffin. Archanes, Phourni, 1700–1450 BC.

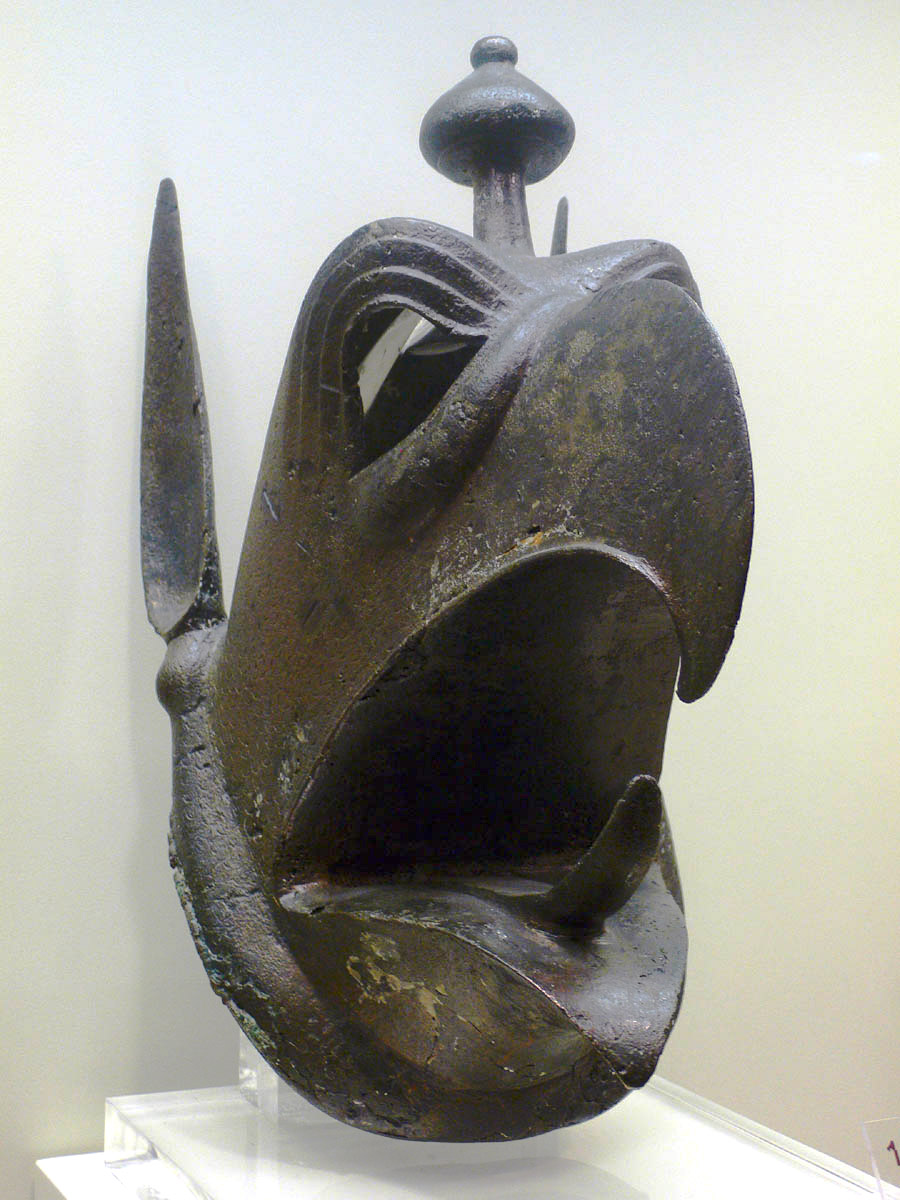
Bronze griffin head fragment (of a cauldron protome) —Olympia, Greece. 7th century BC. Olympia museum

Griffin-type animals appeared in the art of ancient Crete in the MM III Period (1650–1600 BC) in Minoan chronology, found on sealings from Zakro and miniature frescos dated to this period. One early example of griffin-types in Minoan art occurs in the 15th century BC frescoes of the Throne Room of the Bronze Age Palace of Knossos, as restored by Sir Arthur Evans.

The griffin-like hybrid became a fixture of Aegean culture since the Late Bronze Age, but the animal called the gryps, gryphon, or griffin in Greek writings did not appear in Greek art until about 700 BC, or rather, it was "rediscovered" as artistic motif in the 8th to 7th centuries BC, adapting the style of griffin current in Neo-Hittite art. It became quite popular in the 6th and 5th centuries BC, when the Greeks first began to record accounts of the "gryps" creature from travelers to Asia, such as Aristeas of Proconnesus. A number of bronze griffin protomes on cauldrons have been unearthed in Greece (on Samos, and at Olympia, etc., cf. fig. right). Early Greek and early Etruscan (e.g. the Barberini) examples of cauldron-griffins may have been of Syric-Urartian make, based on evidence (the "tendrils" or "tresses" motif was already touched upon, above), but "Vannic (Urartian) originals" have yet to be found (in the Orient). It has thus been controversially argued (by Ulf Jantzen) that these attachments had always since the earliest times been crafted by Greek workshops, (Note: That later griffin protomes are Greek-made is "without question" (Goldman (1960), p. 321).) added to the plain cauldrons imported from the Near East. (Note: George M. A. Hanfmann agreed with Jantzen that the protomes were always Greek, but disagreed with Jantzen on the caudron, and doubted cauldrons were separately made in the East.) Detractors (notably K. R. Maxwell-Hyslop) believe that (early examples of) the griffin-ornamented cauldron, in its entirely, were crafted in the East, though excavated finds from the Orient are scarce.

=== Central Asia ===
In Central Asia, the griffin image was included in Scythian "animal style" artifacts of the 6th–4th centuries BC, and griffin variants extend as well to the artifacts and tattoos of the Pazyryk culture of the Altai Mountains. The Golden Pectoral from Tovsta Mohyla, interred in Scythian king's burial site, perhaps commissioned to Greek goldsmiths, who engraved the image of a griffin attacking a horse. Other Scythian artifacts show griffins attacking horses, stags, and goats. Griffins are typically shown attacking horses, deer, and humans in Greek art. Nomads were said to steal griffin-guarded gold according to Scythian oral traditions reported by Greek and Roman travelers.

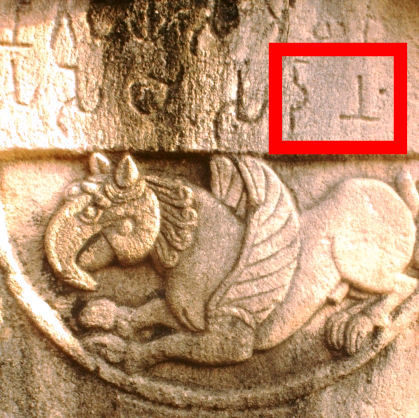
Griffin inscription at Sanchi Stupa from 3rd century BCE

== Ancient parallels ==
Several ancient mythological creatures are similar to the griffin. These include the Lamassu, an Assyrian protective deity, often depicted with a bull or lion's body, eagle's wings, and human's head.

Sumerian and Akkadian mythology feature the demon Anzu, half man and half bird, associated with the chief sky god Enlil. This was a divine storm-bird linked with the southern wind and the thunder clouds.

Jewish mythology speaks of the Ziz, which resembles Anzu, as well as the ancient Greek Phoenix. The Bible mentions the Ziz in Psalms 50:11. This is also similar to a cherub. The cherub, or sphinx, was very popular in Phoenician iconography.

In ancient Crete, griffins became very popular, and were portrayed in various media. A similar creature is the Minoan Genius.

In the Hindu religion, Garuda is a large bird-like creature that serves as a mount (vahana) of the deity Vishnu. It is also the name for the constellation Aquila.

== Classical accounts ==
=== Grecian accounts of the gryphon ===
Local lore on the gryps or griffin was gathered by Aristeas of Proconnesus, a Greek who traveled to the Altai region between Mongolia and NW China in the 7th century BC. Although Aristeas's original poem was lost, the gryps lore was preserved in secondhand accounts by the playwright Aeschylus (ca. 460 BC) and later his contemporary, Herodotus the historian.

Herodotus explains (via Aristeas) that the gold-guarding griffin supposedly dwelled further north than the one-eyed Arimaspi people (Note: But "Herdotus doubted that Arimaspeans were monocular". The Scythian word "arimasp" signifies "rich in horses rather than one-eyed) who robbed the gold from the fabulous creatures. Aristeas is said to have been informed through the Issedones people, who neighbored the region of the Arimaspi in the northern extremes (of Central Asia). (Note: Herodotus III.116, IV.13.) Aeschylus also says that the Arimaspi robbed the gold which the griffins collected from various areas in the periphery (presumably including the Armaspi's territorial stream, the stream of Pluto "rolling with gold"). The equestrian Arimaspi would ride off with the loot, and the griffins would give pursuit. (Note: Aeschylus, Prometheus Bound vv. 805–806, and notes by Watson.)

Aeschylus likened the gryps to "silent hounds of Zeus" (Note: To distinguish from the (screaming) harpies, referred as "dogs of Zeus" (by Apollonius of Rhodes, II.289).) Since they are called dogs or hounds, scholars have conjectured that Aeschylus considered them wingless or flightless. (Note: Mayor's reasoning being that Aeschylus elsewhere refers to eagles as "winged dogs of Zeus". However this seems contradictory to Apollonius being able to refer to winged harpies as "Zeus' dogs", as noted previously.)

Pausanias (geographer) reports that some people claimed that griffins possessed leopard-like spots on their bodies. He then cautions that people who delight in marvelous tales often embellish them, thereby mixing truth with falsehood.

John Tzetzes writes that the Sphinx is said to have the wings of a griffin.

=== Griffins of India and gold-digging ants ===
Ctesias located the griffins in India and more explicitly classed them as beaked, four-legged birds.

Herodotus mentions elsewhere that there are gold-collecting ants in Kashmir, India, and modern scholars have interpreted this account as "doublets or garbled versions" of the lore of gold-hoarding griffins. (Note: Mayor & Heaney (1993), n9, citing Bolton (1962), p. 81 and Costello (1979), p. 75.) It appears that the accounts of griffins given by Pliny had been mixed with the lore of the gold-guarding ants of India, and later Aelian also inserted attributes of the ant into his description of griffins.

=== Pliny and later ===
Later, Pliny the Elder became the first to state explicitly that griffins have wings and long ears. (Note: The word for "eared" in the text is aurita in declined form. auritus. Charlton T. Lewis and Charles Short. A Latin Dictionary on Perseus Project. gives the definition: "Furnished with ears (acc. to auris, l.), having long or large ears".) In one of the two passages, Pliny also located the "griffons" in Æthiopia. According to Adrienne Mayor, Pliny also wrote, "griffins were said to lay eggs in burrows on the ground and these nests contained gold nuggets".

Apollonius of Tyana, (Note: Apollonius of Tyana's writings, as recorded in his biography by Flavius Philostratus.) who was nearly coeval with Pliny, gave a different account of the griffin, claiming them to be lion-sized and having no true wings, instead having paws "webbed with red membranes" that gave them the ability to make leaps of flight over short distances. (Note: Apollonius also compares the griffins to gold-gathering ants, though he places the ants not in India but in Africa (Aethiopia).)

Pomponius Mela (fl. AD 43) wrote in his Book ii. 6:

In Europe, constantly falling snow makes those places contiguous with the Riphaean Mountains.. so impassable that, in addition, they prevent those who deliberately travel here from seeing anything. After that comes a region of very rich soil but quite uninhabitable because griffins, a savage and tenacious breed of wild beasts, love.. the gold that is mined from deep within the earth there, and because they guard it with an amazing hostility to those who set foot there.

The aforementioned Aelian (Claudius Aelianus, d. 235 AD) added certain other embellishments to the lore, such as describing a griffin with "black plumage on its back with a red chest and white wings". (Note: Aelian De natura animaliumIV, 27:"Gryphem, Indicum animal, audio similiter quadrupedem, ut leonem,.." Quoted in English translation by Mayor (2011), p. 33 and excerpted with somewhat different phrasing in Mayor & Heaney (1993), pp. 44–45.) Aelian was the last person to add fresh information on the griffin, and late writers (into medieval times) merely rehashed existing material on griffins, with the exception of the lore about their "agate eggs" which emerged at some indistinct time later on (cf. infra).

=== Divine creature ===
The griffin has been associated with various deities (Apollo, Dionysus, Nemesis) in Greek mythography, but here, the identifiable attested "accounts" presented in scholarship are largely not literary, but artistic or numismatic.

The griffin was linked to Apollo, given the existence of the cultus of Hyperborean Apollo, with a cult center at the Greek colony of Olbia on the Black Sea. The main Temple of Apollo at Delphi featured a statue of the god flanked by griffins, or so it is presumed based on its representation on the tetradrachm coinage of Attica. Apollo rode a griffin to Hyperboria each winter leaving Delphi, or so it was believed. Apollo riding a griffin is known from multiple examples of red-figure pottery. (Note: Vienna, Kunsthistorisches Museum 202, red-figure cup/kylix, ca. 400–300 BC. London, British Museum E 543. red-figure oinochoe.) Apollo also hitched griffins to his chariot, according to Claudian. (Note: Claudian, VI Honorii 30–31: at si Phoebus adest et frenis grypha iugalem / Riphaeo tripodas repetens detorsit ab axe.)

Dionysus was also depicted on a griffin-chariot or mounting a griffin; the motif was borrowed from the god Apollo due to "syncretism between the two gods." (Note: Westgate (2011), p. 298 citing Delplace (1980), pp. 372–376.)

At the Temple of Hera at Samos, a griffin-themed bronze "wine-cup" or "cauldron" had been installed, according to Herodotus. The vessel had griffin heads attached around the rim (like the protomes, described above): it was an Argolic or Argive krater, according to the text, (Note: κρητῆρος Ἀργολικοῦ.) standing on a tripod shaped like colossal figures.

== Medieval accounts ==
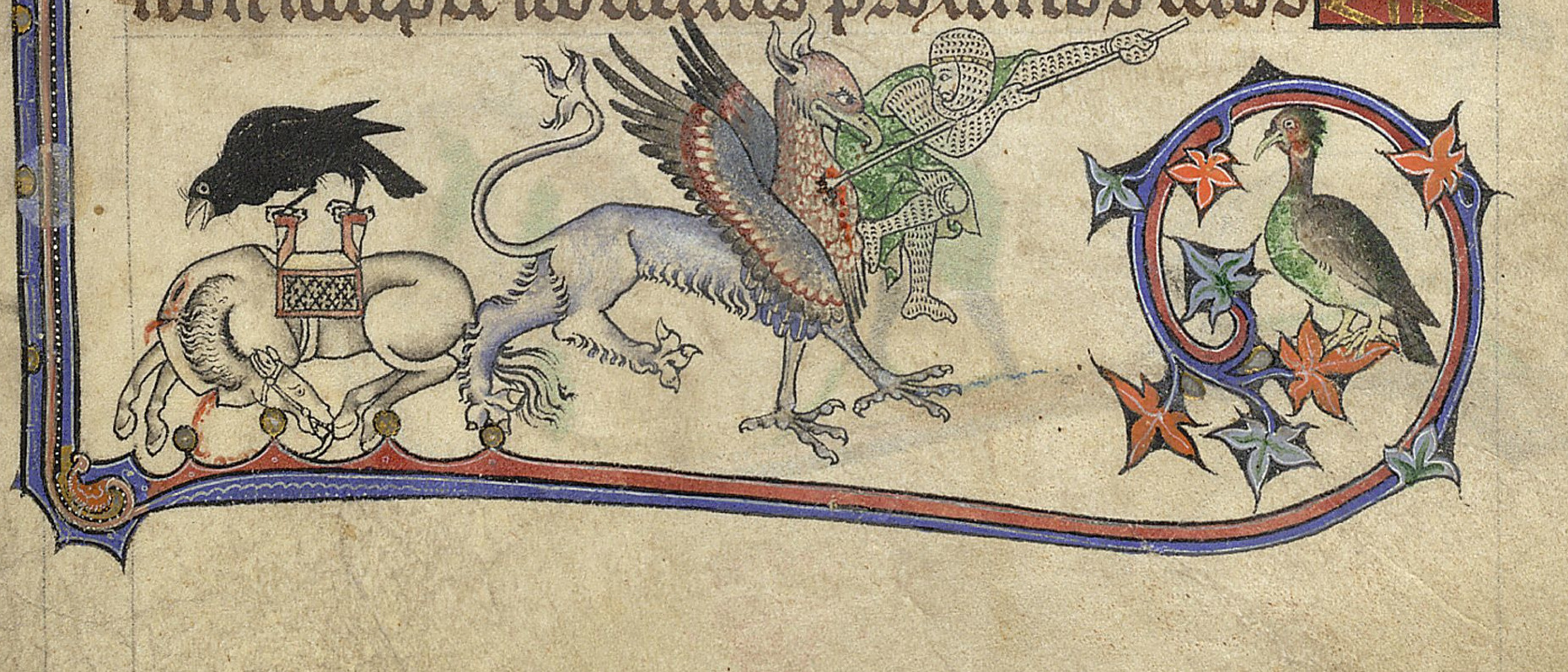
A soldier fighting a griffin, 'Alphonso' Psalter, 1284

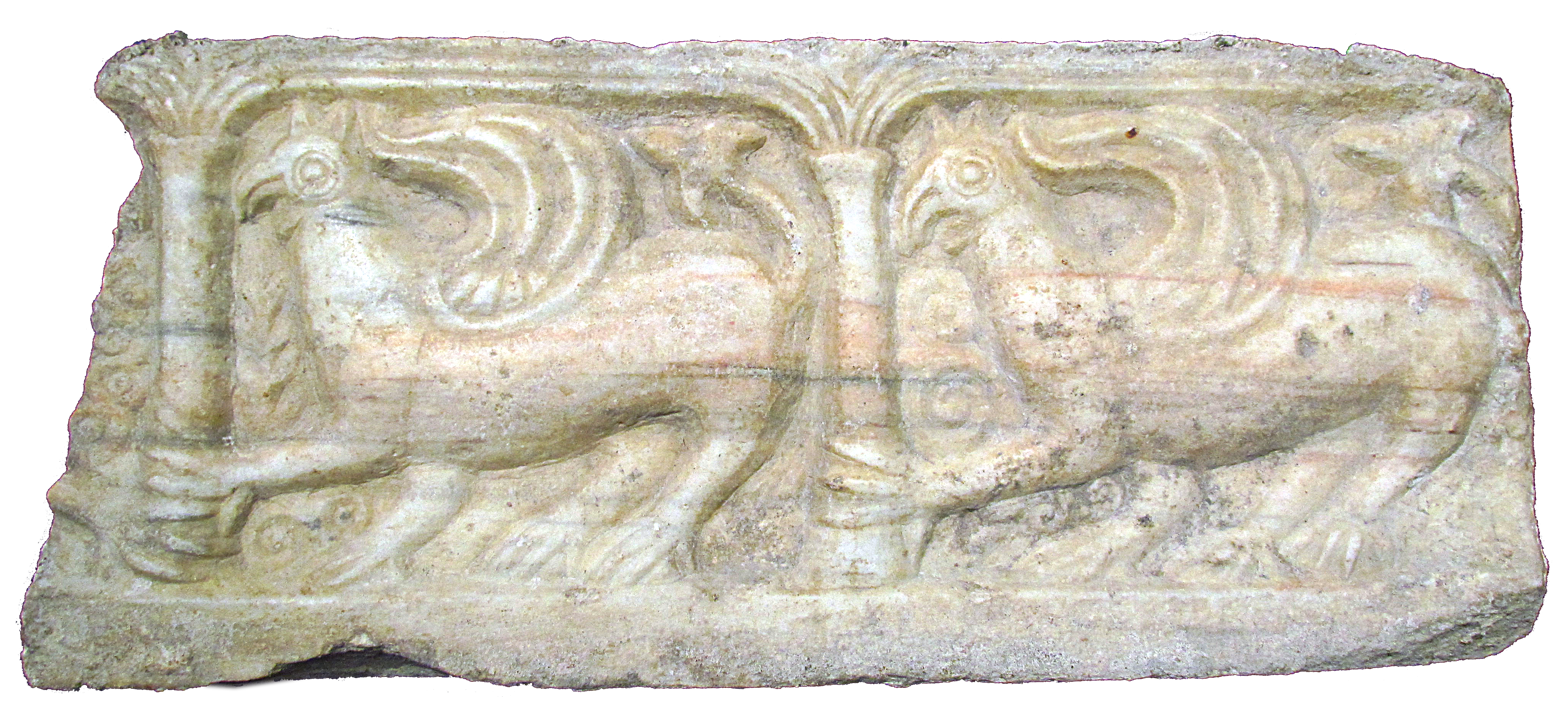
Stonemasonry with Griffins, late 11th-12th c, Gradina, Rakovac. Serbia

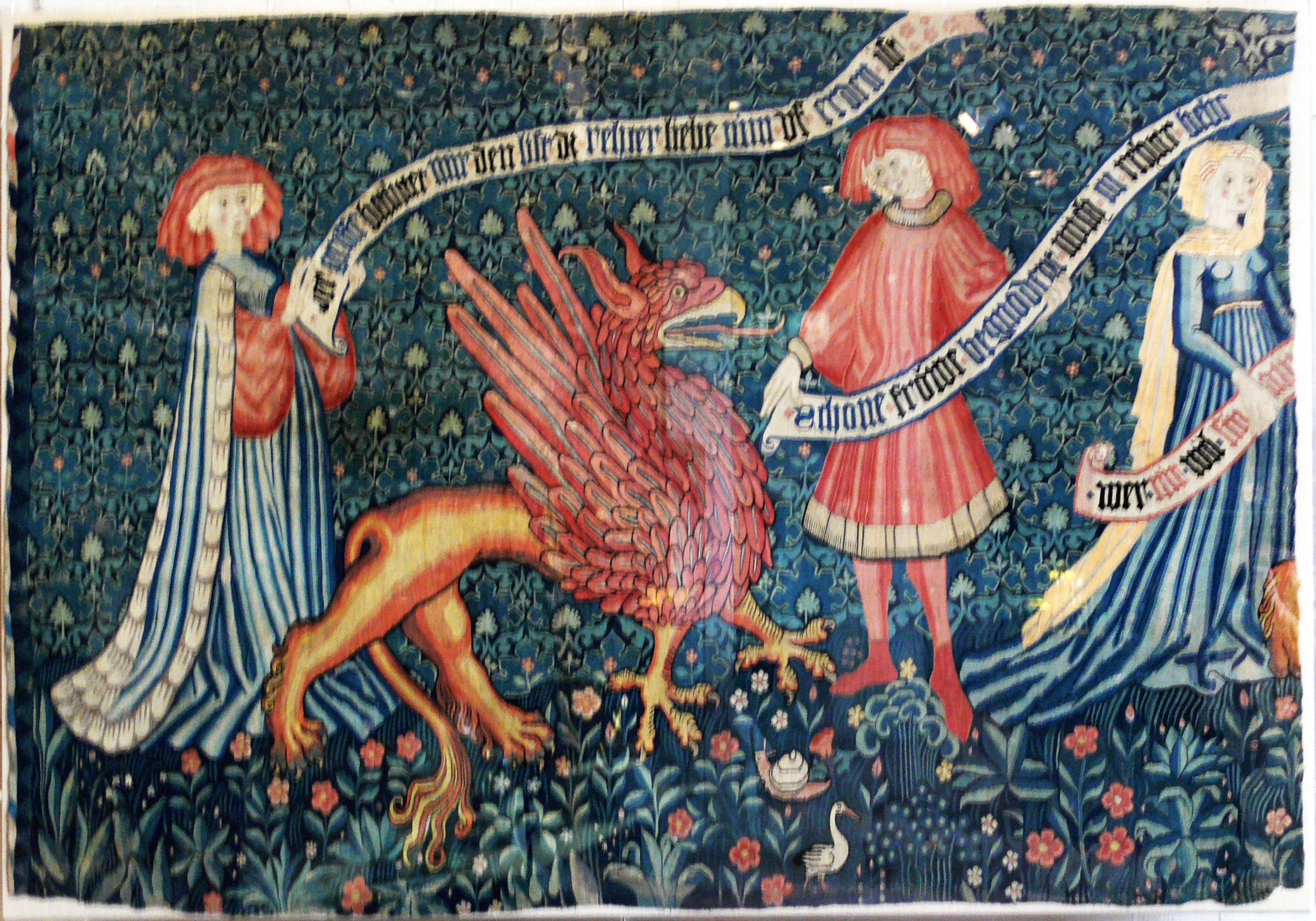
Medieval tapestry, Basel, c. 1450 CE

The notion that griffins lay stones or agate instead of eggs was introduced "at some in the evolution of griffin lore". Albertus Magnus (d. 1280) attributes to other writers the claim that "this bird places an 'eagle-stone' (echytem) or agate (gagatem) among its eggs" to change the ambient temperature and enhance reproduction.

=== Christian symbolism ===
The account of the "gryphes" by Isidore of Seville (d. 636) lacked any Christian allegorical interpretation, and the griffin is classified as a "beast of prey". Thus Isidore (Etymologies xii.2 .17) gives:

The Gryphes are so called because they are winged quadrupeds. This kind of wild beast is found in the Hyperborean Mountains. In every part of their body they are lions, and in wings and heads are like eagles, and they are fierce enemies of horses. Moreover they tear men to pieces".

Isidore's localization of the griffins in the mountains of Hyperborea derives from Servius (4th and 5th century). Griffins had already been localized Riphean Mountains by Mela (1st century) as quoted above, while the Hyperboreans are sometimes said to dwell further north than these mountains.

The idea that griffins hated horses can be explained as an offshoot of the lore that griffins had their gold stolen by horseback-riding Arimaspians. The griffin were already being depicted attacking the horse in ancient art, as on the gold pectoral of the Scythian King noted above.

Despite Isidore passing on classical without religious connotation, the griffin, being a union of an aerial bird and a terrestrial beast, came to be regarded in Christendom as a symbol of Jesus, who was both human and divine, espoused by many commentators, who see this evidenced in the griffin that draws the chariot in Dante's Purgatorio (cf. §In literature below).

A slightly different interpretation was that the griffin symbolized the pope or papacy rather than Christ himself, as proposed by French critic Didron, who built this interpretation upon the observation that Herrad of Landsberg's manuscript (Hortus deliciarum, completed c. 1185) clearly depicted the two-colored bird as symbolic of the Church.

At any rate, the griffin can be found sculpted at a number of Christian churches.

=== Claw, egg, feather ===
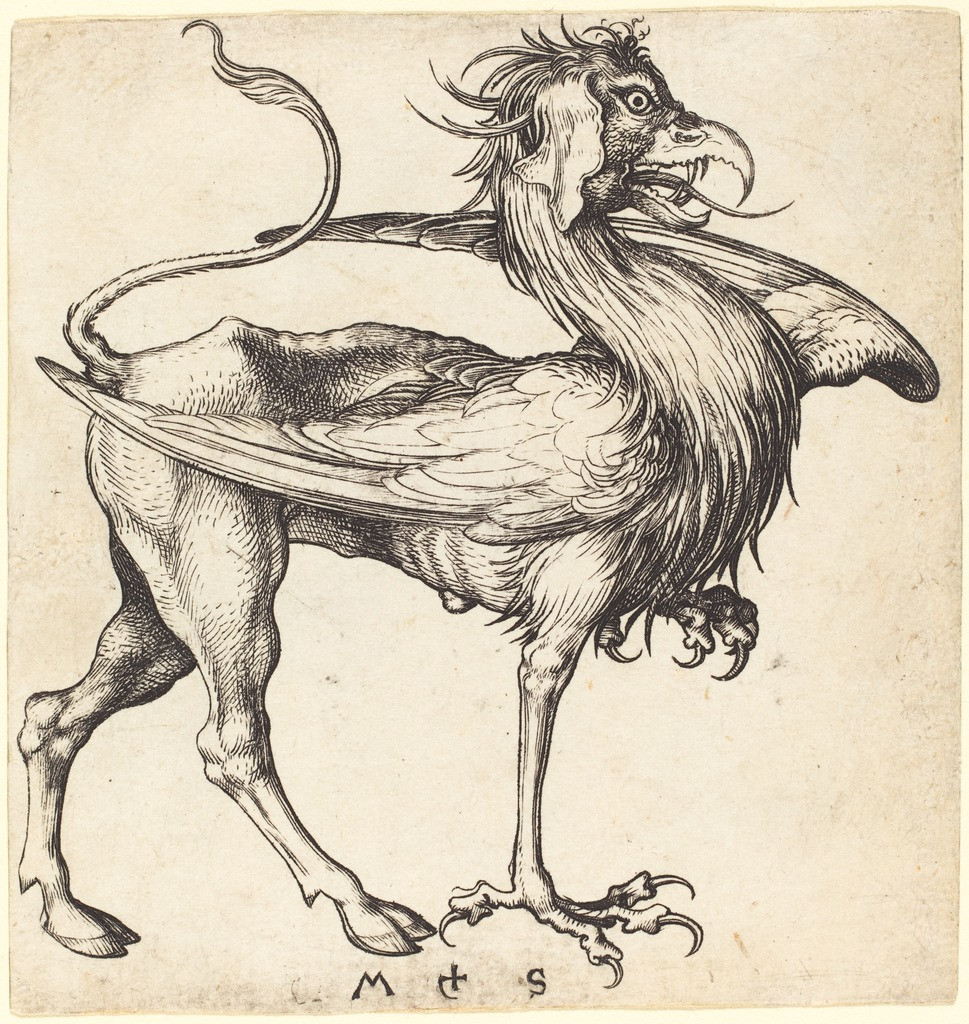
Martin Schongauer: The griffin, 15th century

Alleged griffin's claws, eggs, and feathers were held as valuable objects, but actually derived from exotic animals, etc. The eggs were often ostrich eggs, or in rare cases, fossilized dinosaur eggs. The feather is a piece of forgery, an object crafted from raffia palm fiber, with painted colors.

The supposed claws were often turned into drinking cups (and griffin egg artifacts were also used as goblets, according to heraldry scholars).

A number of medieval griffin's claws existed, sometimes purported to be very large. (Note: Gerald Leigh, in his work on heraldry (1563), surmised from his claw that the original griffin must have been as "bigge as two lyons". Lady Mary Wortley Montague (1716) observed a gilded "prodigious claw" referred to as a griffin's claw while touring the Danube.) St. Cuthbert is said to have obtained claw and egg: two claws and two eggs were registered in the 1383 inventory of the saint's shrine, but the two-feet claws that still remain on display have been identified as Alpine ibex horns.

There is said to be a legend that a griffin's claw was made into a cup and dedicated to Cuthbert. As a matter of fact, griffin claws were frequently fashioned into goblets (drinking cups) in medieval Europe, and specific examples can be given, such as Charlemagne's griffin-claw drinking horn, formerly at Saint-Denis and now housed in the Bibliothèque Nationale, is a drinking cup made of a bovine horn. Additional ornamentation were attached to it, such as a gilt copper leg for it to stand on, realistically resembling the taloned foot of a raptor. (Note: Mayor suggests the griffin horn was one of many gifts from Harun al-Rashid (Aaron), who also gave Charlemagne the live elephant Abul-Abbas (referred to as "Abdul" by Mayor).) Kornelimünster Abbey located in Charlemagne's former capital of Aix-la-Chapelle (now Aachen, Germany) also houses a griffin horn of Pope Cornelius, made of Asian buffalo horn.

=== Medieval iconography ===
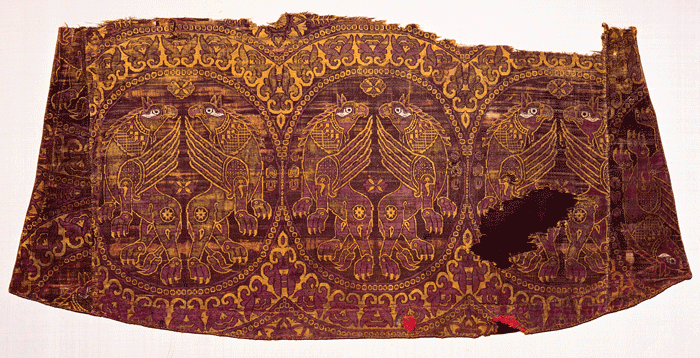
Byzantine silk with griffins, 11th century, now in Sion, Switzerland

By the 12th century, the appearance of the griffin was substantially fixed: "All its bodily members are like a lion's, but its wings and mask are like an eagle's." It is not yet clear if its forelimbs are those of an eagle or of a lion. Although the description implies the latter, the accompanying illustration is ambiguous. It was left to the heralds to clarify that.

Griffins also appear on a wide range of medieval luxury objects, such as textiles, and in these contexts are part of a shared visual language deployed by artisans in the Byzantine, western medieval, and Islamic worlds.

== Folklore ==
According to Stephen Friar's New Dictionary of Heraldry, a griffin's claw was believed to have medicinal properties and one of its feathers could restore sight to the blind.

Attestation of griffin's feather as cure for blindness does occur in an Italian folktale, classed as "The Singing Bone" tale type (ATU 780). There is also a study that considers the griffin's feather tale as a variant of "The Twa Sisters" ballad (Child Ballad 10), as the tale incorporates the song in Italian, supposedly sung by the bones of the murdered finder of the feather). It may not be a griffin's feather but another kind of avian plumage (peacock feather) that remedies blindness in other Italian variants of this folktale type.

== In heraldry ==
A heraldic griffin passant of the Bevan family crest.

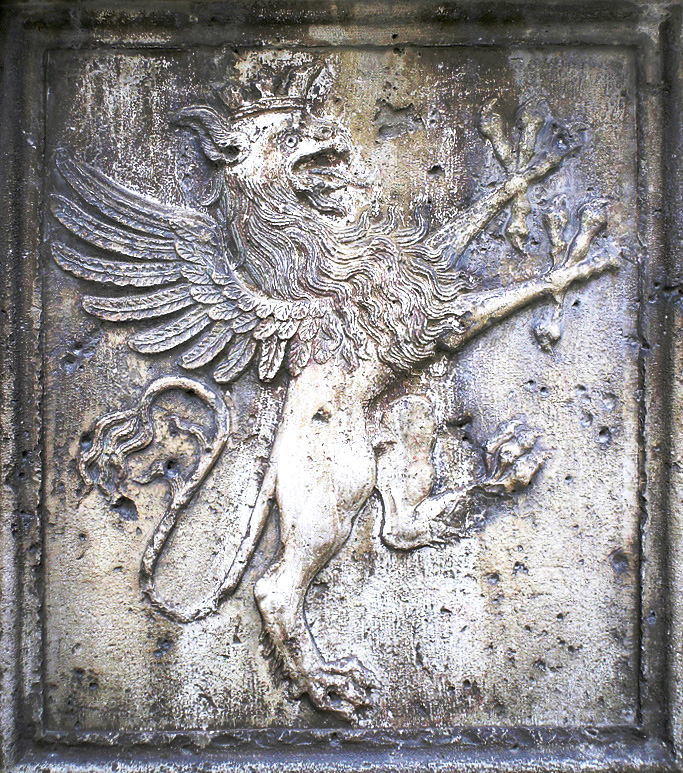
Griffin segreant wearing the mural crown of Perugia, 13th century

Coat of arms of Pomerania

Coat of arms of Szczecin, Poland

Gryf coat of arms, symbol of the Gryfit family used since c. 1481

Coat of arms of Crimea

Griffins in heraldry are usually portrayed with the rear body of a lion, an eagle's head with erect ears, a feathered breast, and the forelegs of an eagle, including claws.

The heraldic griffin "denote[d] strength and military, courage and leadership", according to one source. That it became a Christian symbol of divine power and a guardian of the divine, was already touched upon above.

Griffins may be shown in a variety of poses, but in British heraldry are never shown with their wings closed. Heraldic griffins use the same attitude terminology as the lion, with the exception that where a lion would be described as rampant a griffin is instead described as segreant.

In British heraldry, a male griffin is shown without wings, its body covered in tufts of formidable spikes, with a short tusk emerging from the forehead, as for a unicorn. In some blazons, this variant is termed a keythong. This distinction is not found outside of British heraldry; even within it, male griffins are much rarer than winged ones, which are not given a specific name. One example is John Butler, 6th Earl of Ormond, whose badge was described as featuring a "peyr [pair of] keythongs". It is possible that the male griffin/keythong originated as a derivation of the heraldic panther.

=== Houses and cities using the device ===
When Genoa emerged as a major seafaring power in the Middle Ages and the Renaissance, griffins commenced to be depicted as part of the republic's coat of arms, rearing at the sides of the shield bearing the Cross of St. George.

The red griffin rampant was the coat of arms of the dukes of Pomerania and survives today as the armorial of West Pomeranian Voivodeship (historically, Farther Pomerania) in Poland. It is also part of the coat of arms of the German state of Mecklenburg-Vorpommern, representing the historical region Vorpommern (Hither Pommerania).

== Variants ==
=== Hippogriff ===
A hippogriff is a related legendary creature, supposedly the offspring of a griffin and a mare.

=== Heraldic subtypes ===
==== Wingless griffin ====
Infrequently, a griffin is portrayed without wings, or a wingless eagle-headed lion is identified as a griffin. In 15th-century and later heraldry, such a wingless griffin may be called an alke, a keythong or a male griffin.

==== Sea-griffin ====
The sea-griffin, also termed the gryphon-marine, is a heraldic variant of the griffin possessing the head and legs of the more common variant and the hindquarters of a fish or a mermaid. Sea-griffins are present on the arms of a number of German noble families, including the Mestich family of Silesia and the Barony of Puttkamer.

==== Opinicus ====
The opinicus or epimacus is another heraldic variety of griffin, which is depicted with the head and wings of an eagle, the body and legs of a lion, and the tail of a camel. It is sometimes wingless. The opinicus is rarely used in heraldry, but appears in the arms of the Worshipful Company of Barbers.

== In architecture ==
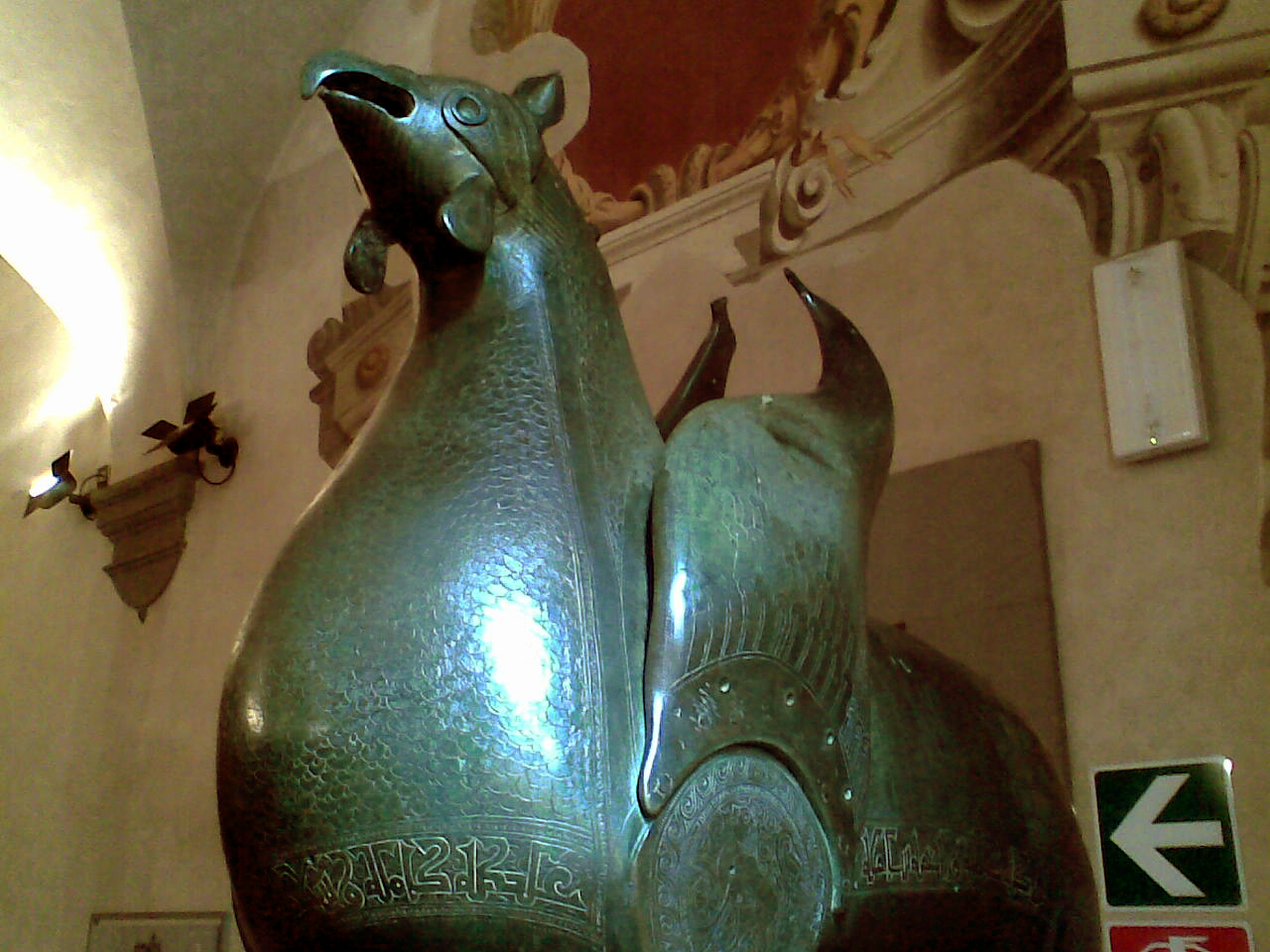
The Pisa Griffin, Pisa Cathedral Museum, 11th century

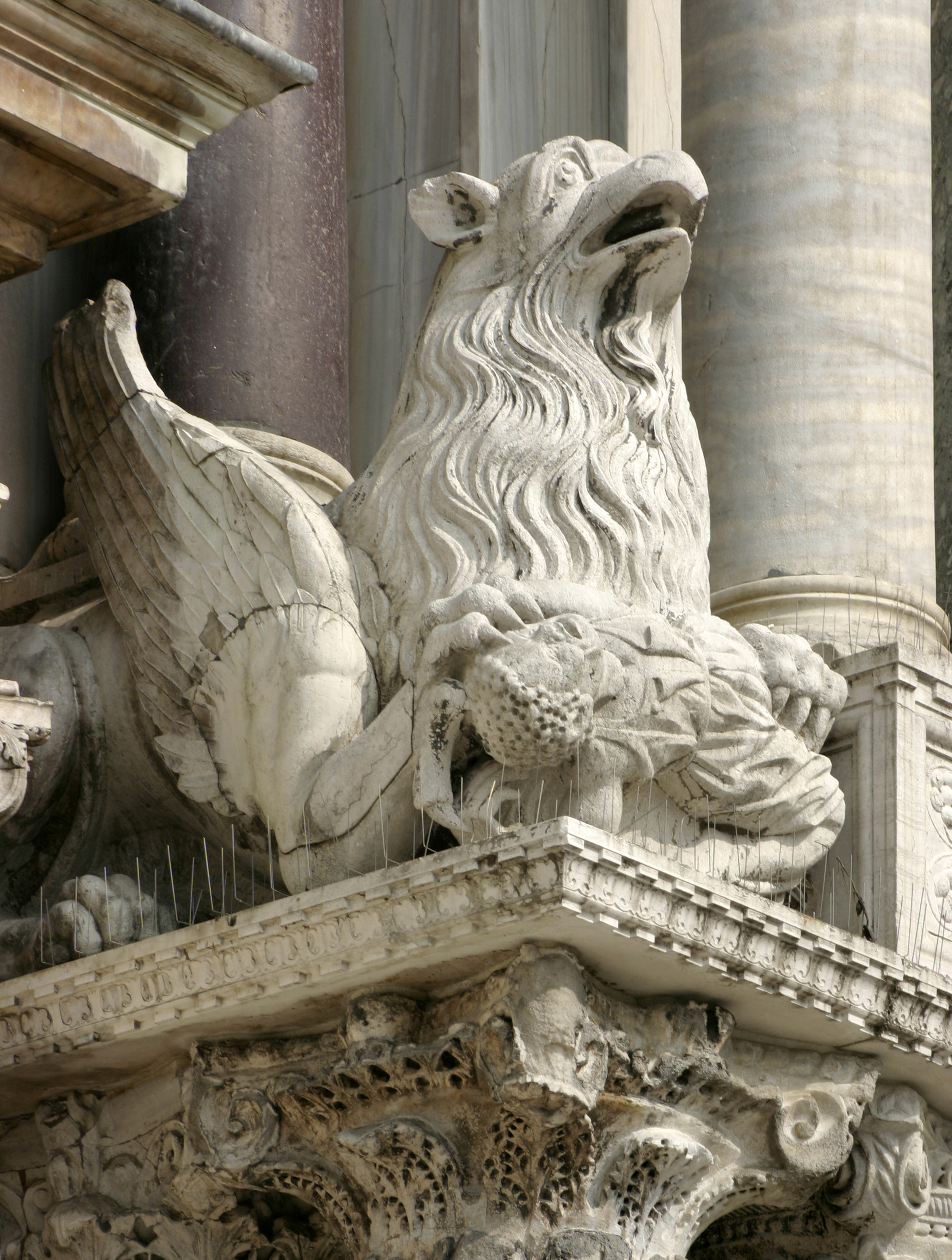
Statue of a griffin. St Mark's Basilica, Venice

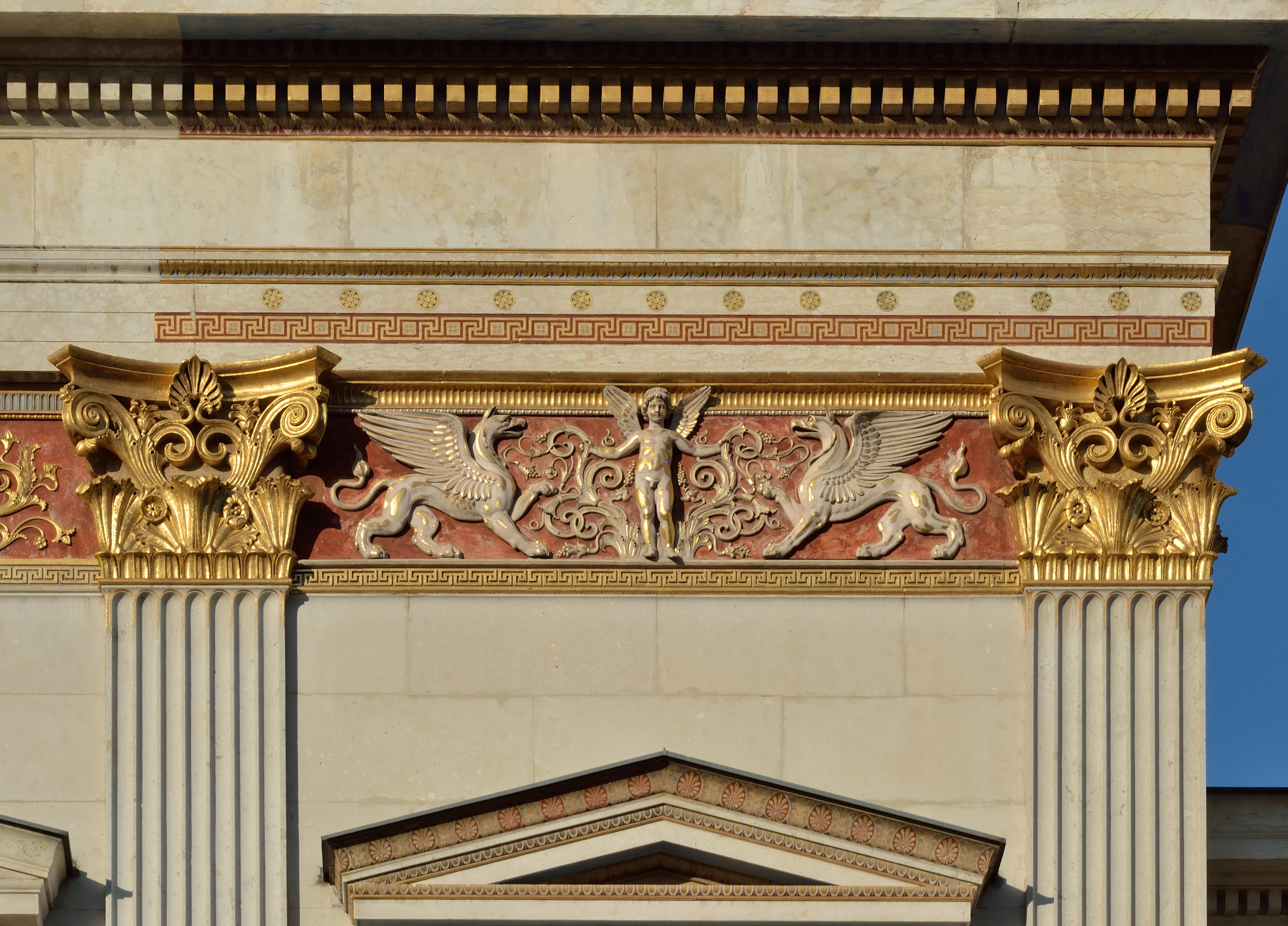
Relief of griffins, Austrian Parliament Building, Vienna

In ancient Rome, at sites such as the Forum of Trajan, griffins featured prominently in the architectural decoration. The Pisa Griffin is a large bronze sculpture that has been in Pisa in Italy since the Middle Ages, though it is of Islamic origin. It is the largest bronze medieval Islamic sculpture known, at over 3 feet tall (42.5 inches, or 1.08 m), and was probably created in the 11th century AD in Al-Andaluz (Islamic Spain). From about 1100 it was placed on a column on the roof of Pisa Cathedral until replaced by a replica in 1832; the original is now in the Museo dell' Opera del Duomo (Cathedral Museum), Pisa.

In architectural decoration the griffin is usually represented as a four-footed beast with wings and the head of an eagle with horns, or with the head and beak of an eagle.

The statues that mark the entrance to the City of London are sometimes mistaken for griffins, but are in fact (Tudor) dragons, the supporters of the city's arms. They are most easily distinguished from griffins by their membranous, rather than feathered, wings.

== In fiction ==
For fictional characters named Griffin, see Griffin (surname)

Griffins are used widely in Persian poetry; Rumi is one such poet who writes in reference to griffins.

In Dante Alighieri's Divine Comedy story Purgatorio, after Dante and Virgil's journey through Hell and Purgatory has concluded, Dante meets a chariot dragged by a griffin in Earthly Paradise. Immediately afterwards, Dante is reunited with Beatrice. Dante and Beatrice then start their journey through Paradise.

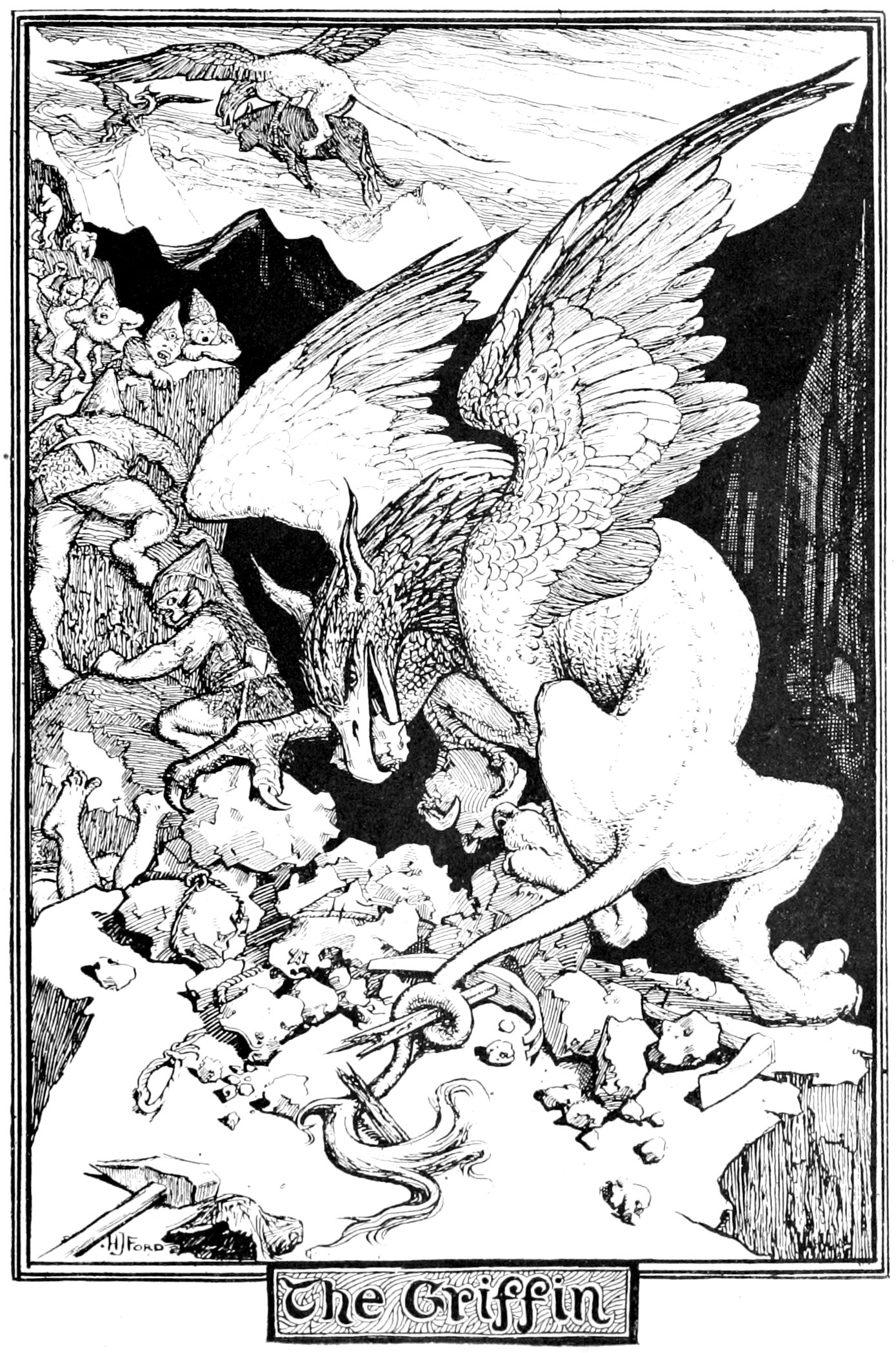
Illustration for Mandeville's legend by H. J. Ford, 1899

Sir John Mandeville wrote about them in his 14th century book of travels, and this textual depiction by Mandeville is typical of the way griffins were used to signal "exotic lands":

In that country be many griffins, more plenty than in any other country. Some men say that they have the body upward as an eagle and beneath as a lion; and truly they say sooth, that they be of that shape. But one griffin hath the body more great and is more strong than eight lions, of such lions as be on this half, and more great and stronger than an hundred eagles such as we have amongst us. For one griffin there will bear, flying to his nest, a great horse, if he may find him at the point, or two oxen yoked together as they go at the plough. For he hath his talons so long and so large and great upon his feet, as though they were horns of great oxen or of bugles or of kine, so that men make cups of them to drink of. And of their ribs and of the pens of their wings, men make bows, full strong, to shoot with arrows and quarrels.

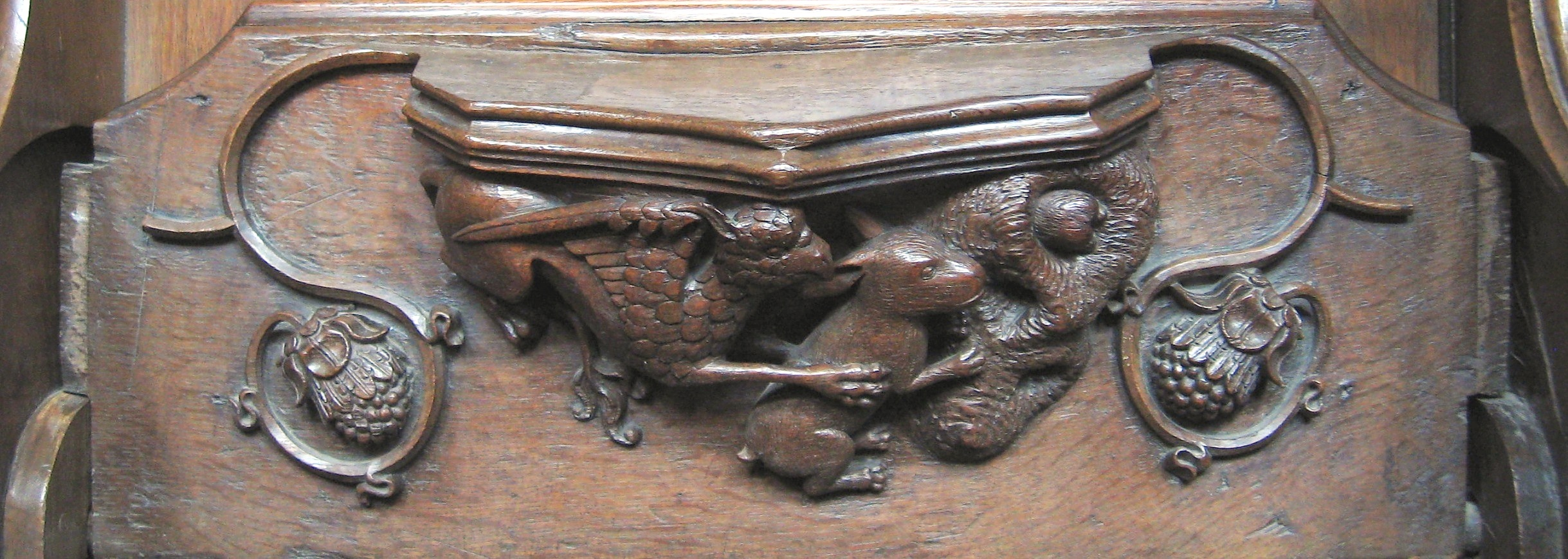
Griffin misericord, Ripon Cathedral, alleged inspiration for the Gryphon in Lewis Carroll's Alice's Adventures in Wonderland

John Milton in Paradise Lost he mentions the griffin as an allusion to Satan:

As when a Gryfon through the Wilderness

With winged course ore Hill or moarie Dale,
Pursues the Arimaspian, who by stelth
Had from his wakeful custody purloind

The guarded Gold [...]

== Theories of origin ==
=== Possible influence by dinosaurs ===
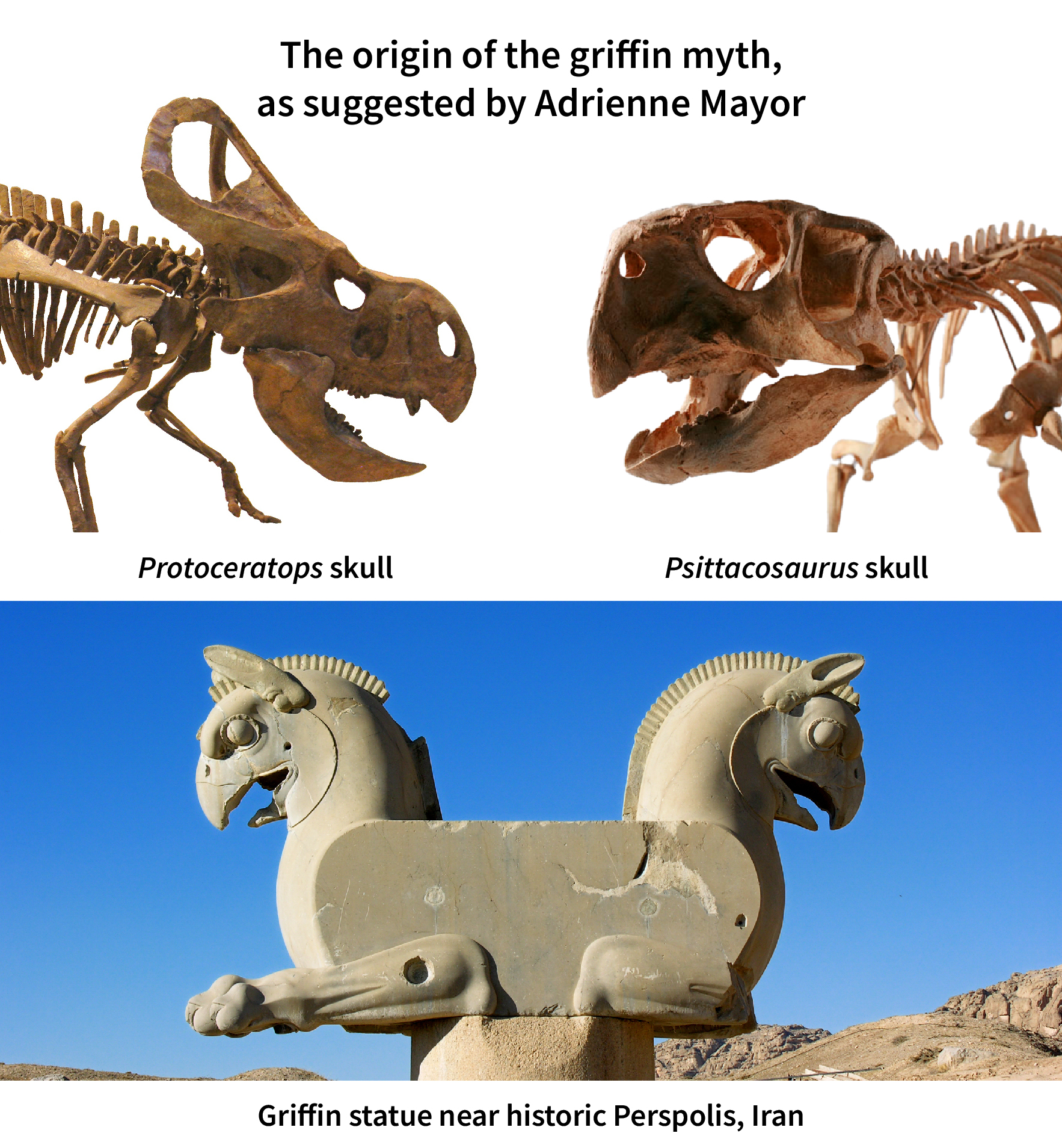
Early historic references to the gryphon describe the area of the Dzungarian Gate, a region where Protoceratops and Psittacosaurus skeletons are very common.

Discounting the evidence of extensive contact between West Asia and Greece, and the transmission of griffin imagery through that pathway, Adrienne Mayor, a classical folklorist and science historian, speculates that the way the Greeks imagined griffins from the seventh century BC onwards may have been influenced in part by the fossilized remains of beaked dinosaurs such as Protoceratops and Psittacosaurus that ancient Scythian (Central Asian) nomadic prospectors saw on the way to gold deposits. This speculation is based on Greek and Latin literary sources and related artworks in a specific time frame, beginning with the first written descriptions of griffins as real animals of Asia in a lost work by Aristeas (referenced by Herodotus, ca. 450 BC) and ending with Aelian (3rd century AD), the last ancient author to report any "new" details about the griffin.

Mayor took a paleo-cryptozoological approach, trying to identify the unknown creature by its features: mammalian body but head with raptor's beak, dwelling in Eastern deserts en route to gold deposits, laying eggs in nests on the ground. No living animal matched this description, but some dinosaurs had all these features, raising the question of whether the ancient nomads who told Greeks about griffins could have seen fossils of beaked dinosaurs and nests with eggs. Traffic went both ways on the ancient trade routes; traders and gold seekers traveling west from China recounted tales of these strange creatures that were transmitted to the Greco-Roman world through translators. On their way to the gold-dust-bearing gullies of the Altai ("Gold") Mountains and Tien Shan gold belts, travelers from the east would pass through the Gobi and arrive in Issedonian territory (Issedon Serica and Issedon Scythica, desert stations where the griffin was first described to Greeks), having observed or heard garbled descriptions of strange beaked quadrupeds east of those points.

Mayor argues that Protoceratops and other fossils, seen by ancient observers, may have been interpreted as evidence of a half-bird-half-mammal creature. She argues that repeated oral descriptions and artistic attempts to illustrate a bony neck frill (which is rather fragile and may have been broken or entirely weathered away) may have been rendered as large mammal-type external ears, and its beak may have been treated as evidence of a part-bird nature, leading to stylized wings being added to match the creature's avian-like attributes. The narrow, elongated scapula of beaked dinosaurs resembles that of birds, and this avian feature may have suggested to ancient observers that the creature had wings.

Paleontologist Mark P. Witton contests this hypothesis. McClanan, Witton, and Richard A. Hing argue that it ignores the existence of depictions of hybrid creatures bird's heads on mammal bodies throughout the Near East dating to long before the time Mayor posits the Greeks became aware of Protoceratops fossils in Scythia. They further argue that the anatomies of griffins in Greek art are clearly based on those of living creatures, especially lions and eagles, and that there are no features of griffins in Greek art that can only be explained by the hypothesis that the griffins were based on fossils. They note that Greek accounts of griffins describe them as living creatures, not ancient skeletons, and that some of the details of these accounts suggest griffins are purely imaginary, not inspired by fossils.

== Modern culture ==
=== Popular fiction ===
Griffins, like many other fictional creatures, frequently appear within works under the fantasy genre. Examples of fantasy-oriented franchises that feature griffins include Warhammer Fantasy Battle, Warcraft, Heroes of Might and Magic, the Griffon in Dungeons & Dragons, Ragnarok Online, Harry Potter, The Spiderwick Chronicles, My Little Pony: Friendship is Magic, and The Battle for Wesnoth.

Griffins appear in the fairy tales "Jack the Giant Killer", "The Griffin" and "The Singing, Springing Lark".

In Digimon, there is a Digimon called Gryphomon who is based on the depiction of a griffin that has a snake-headed tail.

In The Son of Neptune by Rick Riordan, Percy Jackson, Hazel Levesque, and Frank Zhang are attacked by griffins in Alaska.

In the Harry Potter series, the character Albus Dumbledore has a griffin-shaped knocker. Also, the character Godric Gryffindor's surname is a variation on the French griffon d'or ("golden griffon").

In The Empyrean series by Rebecca Yarros, griffins are the chosen mounts for the fliers of Poromiel.

=== Modern art ===
The griffin appears in French symbolist precursors to the modernist period in the work of Gustave Moreau as noted in his painting of "the Fairy and the Gryphons" ("La fée aux griffons," 1876) shown below.

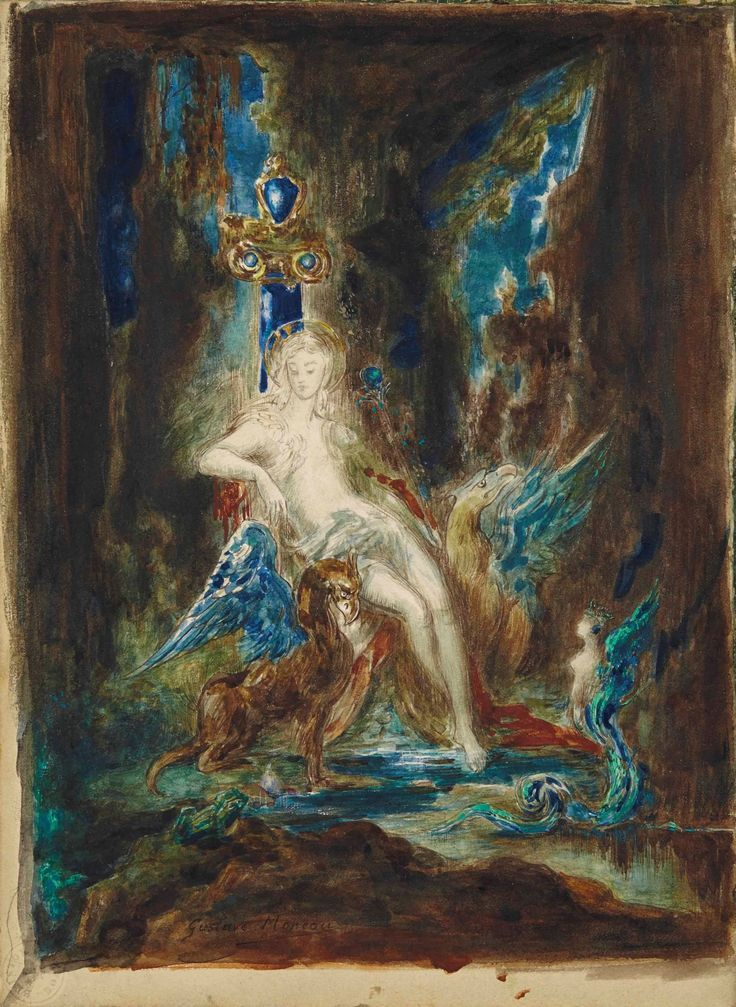
The fairy and gryphons

Through his friendship with Marcel Proust, Jean Cocteau the twentieth-century surrealist artist, writer and filmmaker, became familiar with the paintings of Gustave Moreau. Whether or not this is related to Cocteau's own rendering of "Le Griffon" which is a 1957 colored lithograph depicting an eagle-headed, winged male dancer in the style of a costume design for les Ballets Russes is unknown, yet clearly shows the lion part of the griffin replaced by the strong physique of the ballet dancer in red tights.

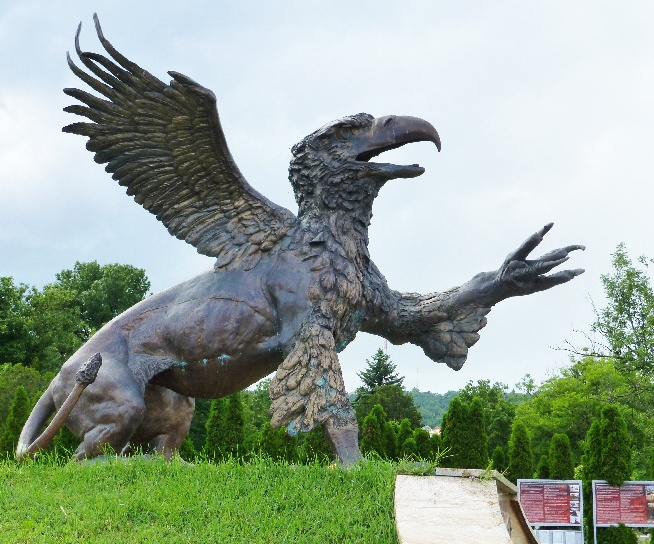
"Griff" Statue in the forecourt of the Farkasréti Cemetery Budapest, 2007

The griffin is also the symbol of the Philadelphia Museum of Art; bronze castings of them perch on each corner of the museum's roof, protecting its collection.

The "Griff" statue by Veres Kálmán was erected in 2007 at the forecourt of the Farkasréti Cemetery in Budapest, Hungary.

== Logos, mascots ==
An archaic griffin design, created by artist Thomas Fanourakis (1915–1993), was adopted as the official symbol of the city of Heraklion on 22 March 1961 (cf. figure right). (Note: The design of the griffin is a mock-up of Minoan art, but the inscription language is archaicized Greek, not Minoan (Linear A and Cretan hieroglyphs).)

Film and television company Merv Griffin Entertainment uses a griffin for its production company. Merv Griffin Entertainment was founded by entrepreneur Merv Griffin and is based in Beverly Hills, California. His former company Merv Griffin Enterprises also used a griffin for its logo.

The griffin is used in the logo of United Paper Mills, Vauxhall Motors, and of Scania and its former partners Saab Group and Saab Automobile.

Similarly, prior to the mid-1990s a griffin formed part of the logo of Midland Bank (now HSBC).

Saab Automobile previously used the griffin in their logo (Cf. Saab fighter Gripen)

=== School emblems and mascots ===
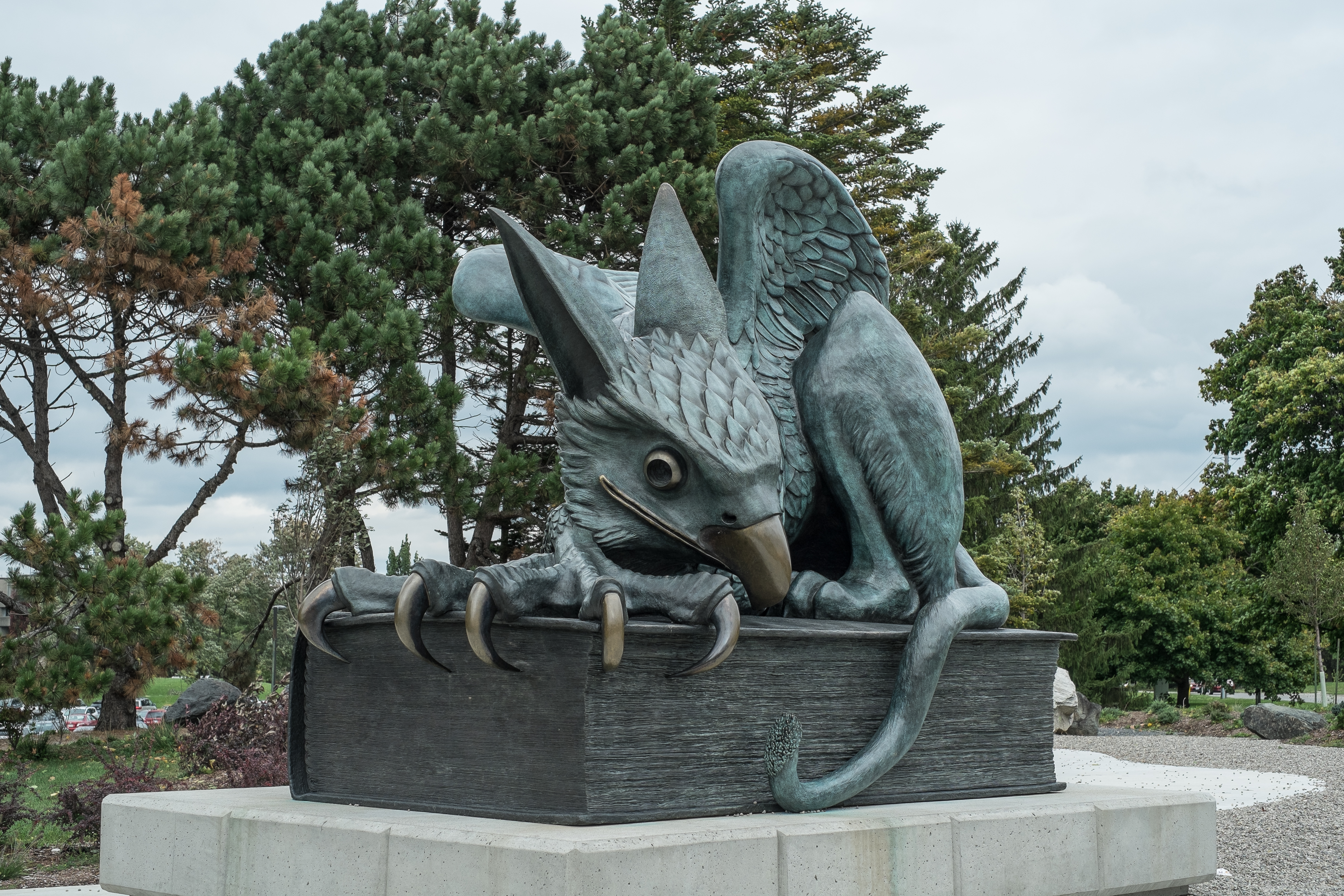
The Gryphon is the emblem and mascot of the University of Guelph

Three gryphons form the crest of Trinity College, Oxford (founded 1555), originating from the family crest of founder Sir Thomas Pope. The college's debating society is known as the Gryphon, and the notes of its master emeritus show it to be one of the oldest debating institutions in the country, significantly older than the more famous Oxford Union Society. Griffins are also mascots for VU University Amsterdam, Reed College, Sarah Lawrence College, the University of Guelph, and Canisius College.

The Gryphon is the official school mascot for Raffles Institution, appearing also on the top of the school crest.

The official seal of Purdue University was adopted during the university's centennial in 1969. The seal, approved by the Board of Trustees, was designed by Prof. Al Gowan, formerly at Purdue. It replaced an unofficial one that had been in use for 73 years.

The College of William and Mary in Virginia changed its mascot to Griffin in April 2010. The griffin was chosen because it is the combination of the British lion and the American eagle, a transition that faced some controversy and was even commented upon by alumnus comedian Jon Stewart.

The 367th Training Support Squadron's and 12th Combat Aviation Brigade feature griffins in their unit patches.

The emblem of the Greek 15th Infantry Division features an ax-wielding griffin on its unit patch.

The English private school of Wycliffe College features a griffin on its school crest.

The mascot of St Mary's College, one of the 16 colleges in Durham University, is a griffin.

The mascot of Glebe Collegiate Institute in Ottawa is the gryphon, and the team name is the Glebe Gryphons.

Gryph the gryphon is the mascot of the University of Guelph in Ontario, Canada, and the campus features a gryphon statue at its main entrance.

The griffin is the official mascot of Chestnut Hill College and Gwynedd Mercy University, both in Pennsylvania.

The mascot of Leadership High School in San Francisco, CA was chosen by the student body by popular vote to be the griffin after the Golden Gate University Griffins, where they operated out of from 1997 to 2000.

The Gryphon is the school mascot for Glenlyon Norfolk School, an independent, co-ed, university preparatory day school in Victoria and Oak Bay, British Columbia, Canada.

=== Police and military ===
Yellow griffin pictured in the logo of the Estonian Internal Security Service.

Flag of the Utti Jaeger Regiment of the Finnish Army

A griffin appears in the official seal of the Waterloo Police Department (Iowa).

The Royal Air Force Police depicts a griffin for their unit badge.

The Royal New Zealand Air Force Police depicts a griffin holding a taiaha for their unit badge.

=== Professional sports ===
The Grand Rapids Griffins professional ice hockey team of the American Hockey League.

Suwon Samsung Bluewings's mascot "Aguileon" is a griffin. The name "Aguileon" is a compound using two Spanish words; "aguila" meaning "eagle" and "leon" meaning "lion".

AC Perugia's crest features a griffin.

=== Amusement parks ===
One of Busch Gardens Williamsburg's attractions is a dive coaster called the "Griffon", which opened in 2007.

In 2013, Cedar Point Amusement Park in Sandusky, Ohio opened the "GateKeeper" steel roller coaster, which features a griffin as its mascot.

=== Iran Air Logo ===
The logo design of Iran Air features a griffin. The pattern of this design, created by Edward Zahrabian, is based on a griffin statue found in Persepolis. A common mistake regarding this is the assumption that the griffin is the same as the mythical bird Homa, but this is incorrect. This mistake has arisen because the acronym for the National Airline of Iran in Persian is "Homa".

== In film and television ==
Griffins appear in The Chronicles of Narnia: The Lion, the Witch and the Wardrobe and The Chronicles of Narnia: Prince Caspian.

Griffins are also present in various animated series such as My Little Pony: Friendship is Magic, World of Quest, Yin Yang Yo!, and Family Guy.

A griffin appeared in the 1974 film The Golden Voyage of Sinbad fighting a centaur.

In the 1969 movie Latitude Zero, a creature called "Griffin" is made by inserting a woman's brain into a lion–condor hybrid.

In an episode of the sitcom The Big Bang Theory, Dr. Sheldon Cooper mentions that he attempted to create a griffin but could not obtain the "necessary eagle eggs and lion semen".

== Eponymy ==
The latest fighter produced by the Saab Group bears the name "Gripen" (Griffin), as a result of public competition.

During World War II, the Heinkel firm named its heavy bomber design for the Luftwaffe after the legendary animal, as the Heinkel He 177 Greif, the German form of "griffin". General Atomics has used the term "Griffin Eye" for its intelligence surveillance platform based on a Hawker Beechcraft King Air 35ER civilian aircraft.

=== Fauna names ===
Some large species of Old World vultures are called griffines, including the griffon vulture (Gyps fulvus). The scientific name for the Andean condor is Vultur gryphus, Latin for "griffin-vulture". The Catholic Douay-Rheims version of the Bible uses griffon for a creature referred to as vulture or ossifrage in other English translations (Leviticus 11:13).

== Gallery ==
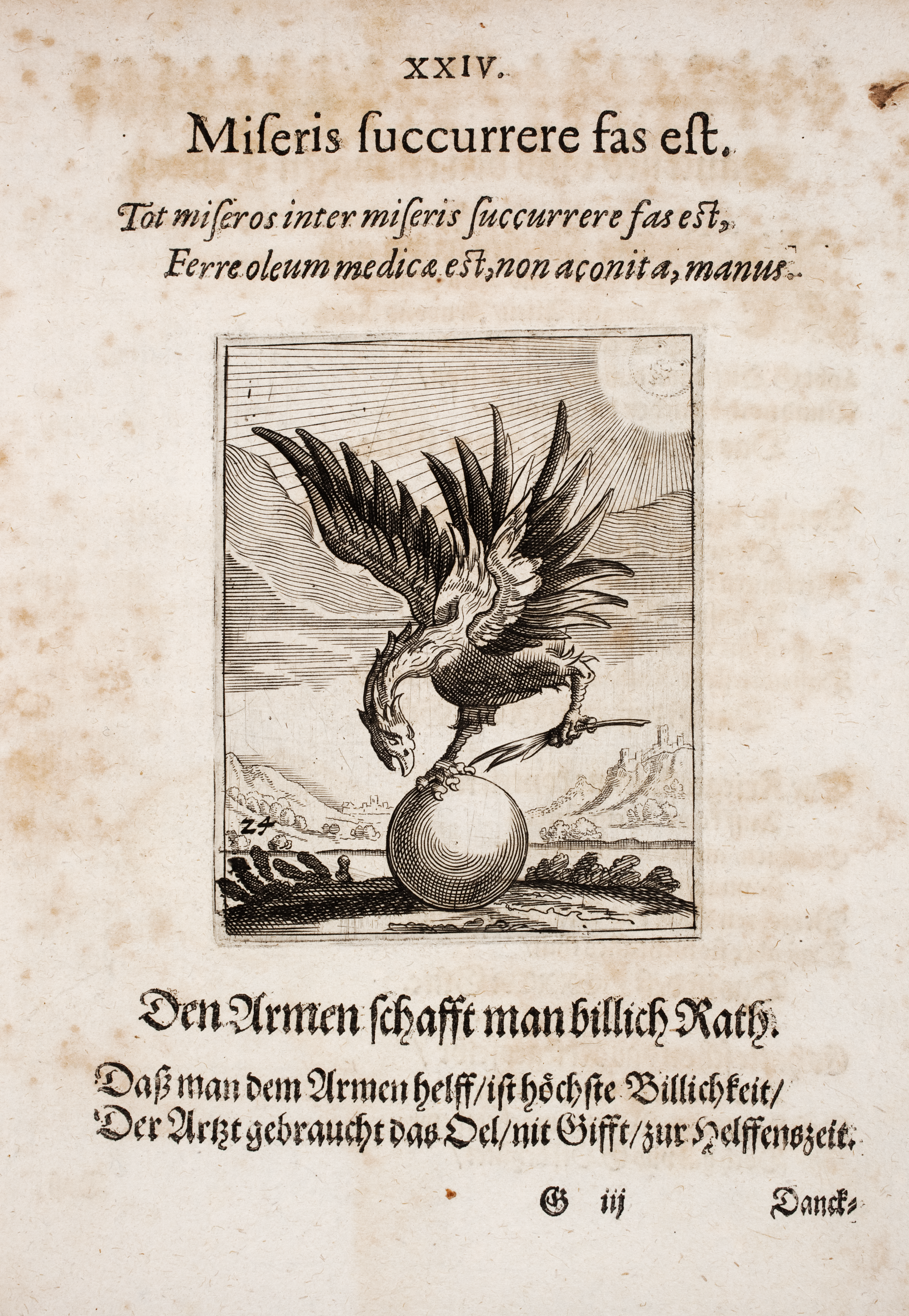
Griffin in Johann Vogel: Meditationes emblematicae de restaurata pace Germaniae, 1649

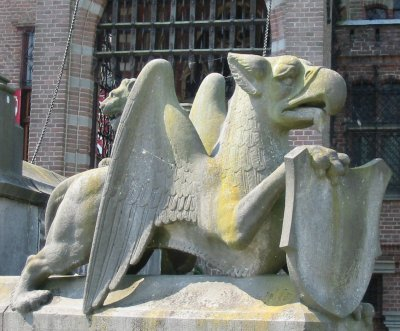
Heraldic guardian griffin at Kasteel de Haar, Netherlands, 1892–1912

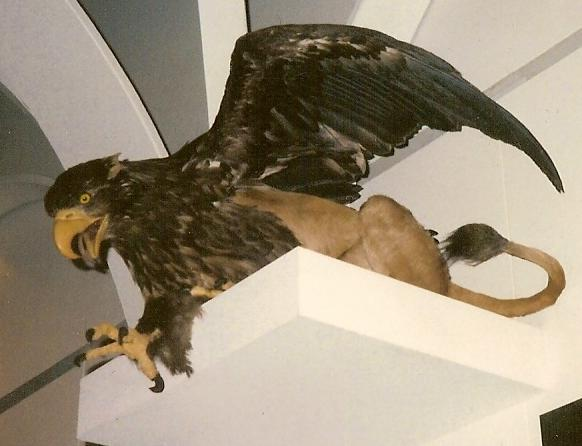
Rogue taxidermy griffin, Zoological Museum, Copenhagen

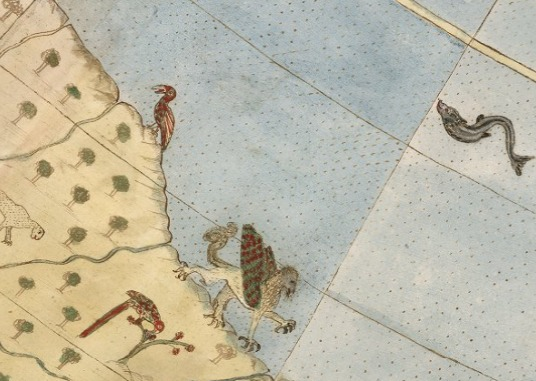
A griffin portrayed in a mythical land located south of the world's known continents, from Urbano Monti's map (1587).

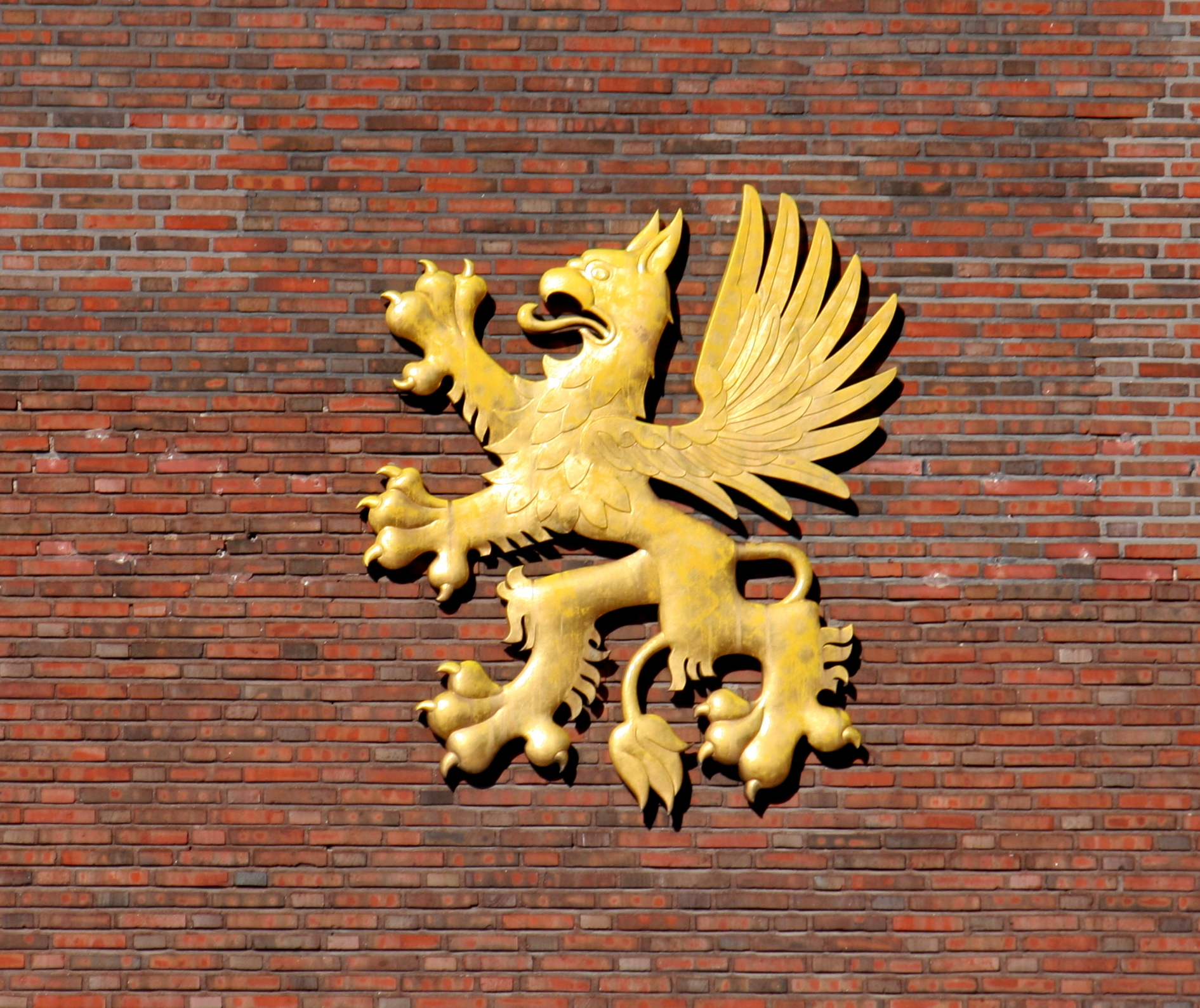
UPM (company) Finnish forest industry company. Symbol came into use in 1899.

== See also ==
- Chimera, Greek mythological hybrid monster
- Duck billed platypus, an egg-producing mammal with a beak
- Hybrid creatures in mythology
- List of hybrid creatures in mythology
- Nue, Japanese legendary creature
- Pegasus, winged stallion in Greek mythology
- Pixiu or Pi Yao, Chinese mythical creature
- Sharabha, Hindu mythology: lion-bird hybrid
- Snow Lion, Tibetan mythological celestial animal
- Yali, Hindu mythological lion-elephant-horse hybrid
