= Proconnesus (city) =

Greek town

Coordinates: 40°35′30″N 27°33′20″E

Proconnesus or Prokonnesos (Ancient Greek: Προκόννησος), also spelt Proeconesus or Proikonnesos (Προικόνησος), was a Greek town on the southwestern shore of Proconnesus island. Aristeas, the poet of the Arimaspeia, was a native. This town, which was a colony of the Milesians, was burnt by a Phoenician fleet, acting under the orders of Persian king Darius I. Strabo distinguishes between old and new Proconnesus. The inhabitants of Cyzicus, at a time which we cannot ascertain, forced the Proconnesians to dwell together with them, and transferred the statue of the goddess Dindymene to their own city.

Under Diocletian's edict against Manichaeism, De Maleficiis et Manichaeis, offenders were sent to labor in the mines at Proconnesus.

Its site is located near the town of Marmara on Marmara Island, Balıkesir Province, Turkey.
