= Arimaspi =

Legendary tribe from the classical antiquity

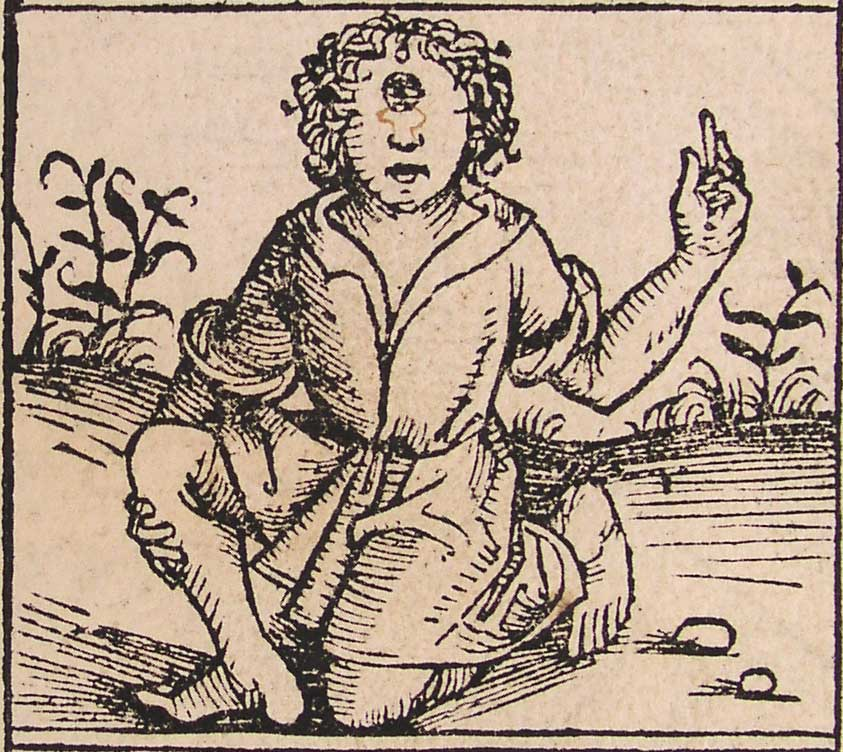
Illustration from the Nuremberg Chronicle (1493)

The Arimaspi (also Arimaspians, Arimaspos, and Arimaspoi; Ancient Greek: Ἀριμασπός, Ἀριμασποί) were a legendary tribe of one-eyed people of northern Scythia who lived in the foothills of the Riphean Mountains, variously identified with the Ural Mountains or the Carpathians. All tales of their struggles with the gold-guarding griffins in the Hyperborean lands near the cave of Boreas, the North Wind (Geskleithron), had their origin in a lost work by Aristeas, reported in Herodotus.

== Legendary Arimaspi ==
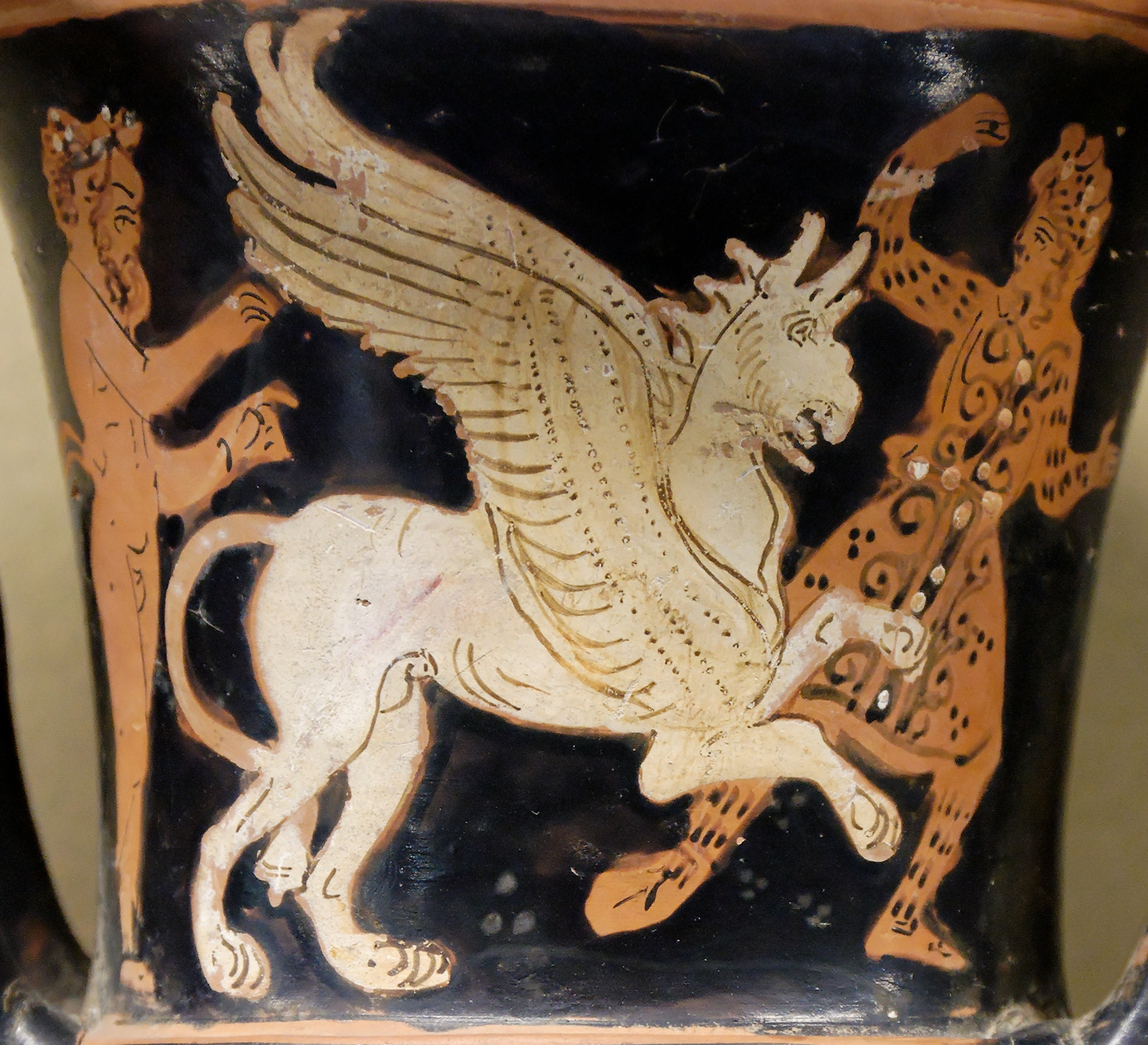
Battles between griffons and warriors in Scythian tunics and leggings were a theme for Greek vase-painters. Spiritual descendants of the one-eyed Arimaspi of Inner Asia may be found in the decorative borderlands of medieval maps and in the monstrous imagery of Hieronymus Bosch.

The Arimaspi were described by Aristeas of Proconnesus in his lost archaic poem Arimaspea. Proconnesus is a small island in the Sea of Marmora near the mouth of the Black Sea, well situated for hearing travellers' tales of regions far north of the Black Sea. Aristeas narrates in the course of his poem that he was "wrapt in Bacchic fury" when he travelled to the north and saw the Arimaspians, as reported by Herodotus:

This Aristeas, possessed by Phoibos, visited the Issedones; beyond these (he said) live the one-eyed Arimaspoi, beyond whom are the Grypes that guard gold, and beyond these again the Hyperboreoi, whose territory reaches to the sea. Except for the Hyperboreoi, all these nations (and first the Arimaspoi) are always at war with their neighbors.

Arimaspi and griffins were historical images associated with the outlands of the north: the Aeschylan Prometheus Bound (ca 415 BC?), describing the wanderings of Io, notes that she is not to pass through the north, among the Arimaspi and griffins, but southward. Herodotus, "Father of History", admits the fantastic allure of the edges of the known world: "The most outlying lands, though, as they enclose and wholly surround all the rest of the world, are likely to have those things which we think the finest and the rarest." (Histories iii.116.1) Ignoring the scepticism of Herodotus, Strabo and Pliny's Natural History perpetuated the stories about the northern people who had a single eye in the center of their foreheads and engaged in stealing gold from the griffins, causing disagreements between the two groups.

== Historical Arimaspi ==
Modern historians speculate on historical identities that may be selectively extracted from the brief account of "Arimaspi". Herodotus recorded a detail recalled from Arimaspea that may have a core in fact: "the Issedones were pushed from their lands by the Arimaspoi, and the Scythians by the Issedones" (iv.13.1). The "sp" in the name suggests that it was mediated through Iranian sources to Greek, indeed in Early Iranian Arimaspi combines Ariama (love) and aspa (horses). Herodotus or his source seems to have understood the Scythian word as a combination of the roots arima ("one") and spou ("eye") and to have created a mythic image to account for it. Similarity of name and location could identify them with the ancestors of the local Uralic people, the Mari.

It has been suggested that the griffins were inferred from the fossilized bones of Protoceratops.

The brief report of Herodotus seems to be very flimsy ground for making unequivocal statements about the historical background out of which the legend emerged. Notwithstanding these reservations, Tadeusz Sulimirski (1970) claims that the Arimaspi were a Sarmatian tribe originating in the upper valley of the River Irtysh, while Dmitry Machinsky (1997) associates them with a group of three-eyed ajna figurines from the Minusinsk Depression, traditionally attributed to the Afanasevo and Okunevo cultures of southern Siberia.

== Mythological background ==
As philologists have noted, the struggle between the Arimaspi and the griffins has remarkable similarities to Homer's account of the Pygmaioi warring with cranes. Michael Rostovtzeff found a rendering of the subject in the Vault of Pygmies near Kerch, a territory that used to have a significant Scythian population. Analogous representations have been discovered as far apart as the Volci of Etruria and the fifth kurgan of Pazyryk. A Hellenistic literary rendering of a battle with uncanny guardian "birds of Ares" is in Argonautica 1.

Cheremisin and Zaporozhchenko (1999), following the methodology of Georges Dumézil, attempt to trace parallels in Germanic mythology (Odin and the mead of poetry, the eagle stealing golden apples of eternal youth). They hypothesize that all these stories, Germanic, Scythian, and Greek, reflect a Proto-Indo-European belief about the monsters guarding the entrance to the otherworld, who engage in battles with the birds conveying the souls of the newly dead to the otherworld and returning with a variety of precious gifts symbolizing new life.

== See also ==
- "Hercules and the Griffin", episode 35
