= Aristeas =

Ancient Greek poet

Aristeas (Greek: Ἀριστέας) was a semi-legendary Greek poet and miracle-worker, a native of Proconnesus in Asia Minor, active ca. 7th century BC. The Suda claims that, whenever he wished, his soul could leave his body and return again. In book IV.13-16 of The Histories, Herodotus reports:

The birthplace of Aristeas, the poet who sung of these things, I have already mentioned. I will now relate a tale which I heard concerning him both at Proconnesus and at Cyzicus. Aristeas, they said, who belonged to one of the noblest families in the island, had entered one day into a fuller's shop, when he suddenly dropt down dead. Hereupon the fuller shut up his shop, and went to tell Aristeas' kindred what had happened. The report of the death had just spread through the town, when a certain Cyzicenian, lately arrived from Artaca, contradicted the rumour, affirming that he had met Aristeas on his road to Cyzicus, and had spoken with him. This man, therefore, strenuously denied the rumour; the relations, however, proceeded to the fuller's shop with all things necessary for the funeral, intending to carry the body away. But on the shop being opened, no Aristeas was found, either dead or alive. Seven years afterwards he reappeared, they told me, in Proconnesus, and wrote the poem called by the Greeks the Arimaspeia, after which he disappeared a second time. This is the tale current in the two cities above-mentioned.

Two hundred and forty years after his death, Aristeas is said to have appeared in Metapontum in southern Italy to command that a statue of himself be set up and a new altar dedicated to Apollo, saying that since his death he had been travelling with Apollo in the form of a sacred raven.

== Arimaspeia ==
Aristeas was supposed to have authored a poem called the Arimaspeia, giving an account of travels in the far North. There he encountered a tribe called the Issedones, who told him of still more fantastic and northerly peoples: the one-eyed Arimaspi, who battle gold-guarding griffins; and the Hyperboreans, among whom Apollo lives during the winter.

Longinus excerpts a portion of the poem:

A marvel exceeding great is this withal to my soul—
Men dwell on the water afar from the land, where deep seas roll.
Wretches are they, for they reap but a harvest of travail and pain,
Their eyes on the stars ever dwell, while their hearts abide in the main.
Often, I ween, to the Gods are their hands upraised on high,
And with hearts in misery heavenward-lifted in prayer do they cry.

Similarly, in his book Chiliades, Ioannes Tzetzes quotes the Arimaspeia. These two accounts form our entire knowledge of the poem, which is otherwise lost.

== In popular culture ==
Neil Gaiman's Sandman comics refer to this story: Aristeas was a poet who lived around 700 BC, and was transformed into one of many ravens who have acted as both adviser and assistant to the Endless known as Dream. Not to be confused with the raven Matthew, the main raven in the Sandman tale, who existed in human form in the Swamp Thing continuity before his time as a resident of the Dreaming. One of the three permanent guardians of the Sandman's castle-gate is a griffon, who on one occasion tells Matthew that he "was hatched and raised in the mountains of Arimaspia.".

== See also ==
- Dzungarian Gate
