= Book of Optics =

11th century treatise by Ibn al-Haytham

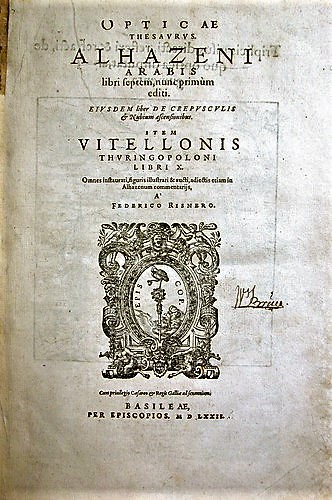
- Cover page for Ibn al-Haytham's Book of Optics in the print edition from 1572
- Author: Ibn al-Haytham
- Original title: كتاب المناظر
- Language: Arabic
- Subject: Optics
- Published: 1011 to 1021

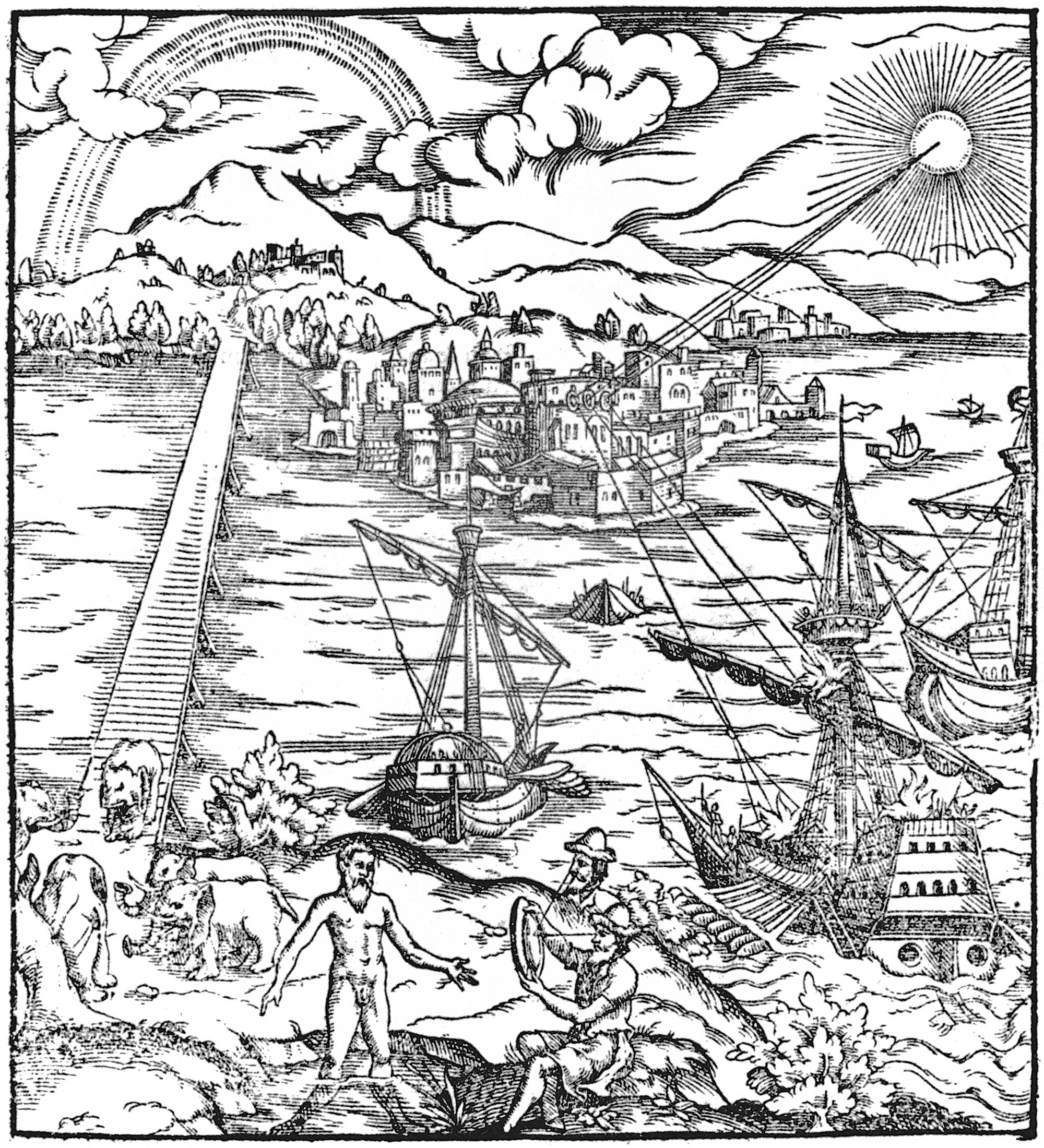
Front page of the Latin Opticae Thesaurus, which included Alhazen's Book of Optics, showing rainbows, the use of parabolic mirrors to set ships on fire, distorted images caused by refraction in water, and other optical effects.

The Book of Optics (Arabic: كتاب المناظر, romanized: Kitāb al-Manāẓir; Latin: De Aspectibus or Perspectiva; Italian: Deli Aspecti) is a seven-volume treatise on optics and other fields of study composed by the medieval Arab scholar Ibn al-Haytham, known in the West as Alhazen or Alhacen (965 – c. 1040 AD).

The Book of Optics presented experimentally founded arguments against the widely held extramission theory of vision (as held by Euclid in his Optica), and proposed the modern intromission theory, the now accepted model that vision takes place by light entering the eye. (Note: "And this [experiment using a camera obscura] can be tried anytime". Book I [6.86] Smith 2001, p. 379) (Note: Book of Optics Book II [3.52] to [3.66] Summary from Smith 2001 p. 444 for Alhazen's experiments on color; pp. 343–394 for his physiological experiments on the eye) The book is also noted for its early use of the scientific method, its description of the camera obscura, and its formulation of Alhazen's problem. The book extensively affected the development of optics, physics and mathematics in Europe between the 13th and 17th centuries.

== Vision theory ==
Before the Book of Optics was written, two theories of vision existed. The extramission or emission theory was forwarded by the mathematicians Euclid and Ptolemy, who asserted that certain forms of radiation are emitted from the eyes onto the object which is being seen. When these rays reached the object they allowed the viewer to perceive its color, shape and size. An early version of the intromission theory, held by the followers of Aristotle and Galen, argued that sight was caused by agents, which were transmitted to the eyes from either the object or from its surroundings.

Al-Haytham offered many reasons against the extramission theory, pointing to the fact that eyes can be damaged by looking directly at bright lights, such as the sun. He wrote of the low probability that the eye can fill the entirety of space as soon as the eyelids are opened as an observer looks up into the night sky. Using the intromission theory as a foundation, he formed his own theory that an object emits rays of light from every point on its surface which then travel in all directions, thereby allowing some light into a viewer's eyes. According to this theory, the object being viewed is considered to be a compilation of an infinite number of points, from which rays of light are projected.

== Light and color theory ==
In the Book of Optics, al-Haytham hypothesized the existence of primary and secondary light, with primary light being the stronger or more intense of the two. The book describes how the essential form of light comes from self-luminous bodies and that accidental light comes from objects that obtain and emit light from those self-luminous bodies. According to Ibn al-Haytham, primary light comes from self-luminous bodies and secondary light is the light that comes from accidental objects. Accidental light can only exist if there is a source of primary light. Both primary and secondary light travel in straight lines. Transparency is a characteristic of a body that can transmit light through them, such as air and water, although no body can completely transmit light or be entirely transparent. Opaque objects are those through which light cannot pass through directly, although there are degrees of opaqueness which determine how much light can actually pass through. Opaque objects are struck with light and can become luminous bodies themselves which radiate secondary light. Light can be refracted by going through partially transparent objects and can also be reflected by striking smooth objects such as mirrors, traveling in straight lines in both cases.

Al-Haytham presented many experiments in Optics that upheld his theories about light and its transmission. He also wrote that color acts much like light, being a distinct quality of a form and travelling from every point on an object in straight lines. Through experimentation he concluded that color cannot exist without air.

== Anatomy of the eye and visual process ==
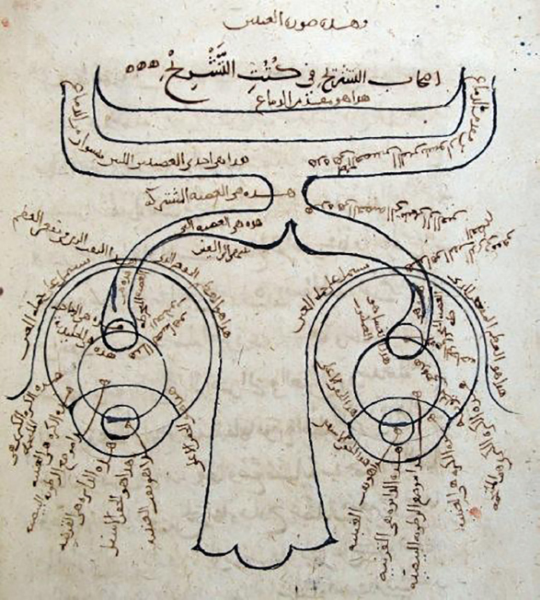
The structure of the human eye according to Ibn al-Haytham. Note the depiction of the optic chiasm. — Manuscript copy of his Kitāb al-Manāẓir (MS Fatih 3212, vol. 1, fol. 81b, Süleymaniye Mosque Library, Istanbul)

As objects radiate light in straight lines in all directions, the eye must also be hit with this light over its outer surface. This idea presented a problem for al-Haytham and his predecessors, as if this was the case, the rays received by the eye from every point on the object would cause a blurred image. Al-Haytham solved this problem using his theory of refraction. He argued that although the object sends an infinite number of rays of light to the eye, only one of these lines falls on the eye perpendicularly: the other rays meet the eye at angles that are not perpendicular. According to al-Haytham, this causes them to be refracted and weakened. He believed that all the rays other than the one that hits the eye perpendicularly are not involved in vision.

In al-Haytham's structure of the eye, the crystalline humor is the part that receives light rays from the object and forms a visual cone, with the object being perceived as the base of the cone and the center of the crystalline humor in the eye as the vertex. Other parts of the eye are the aqueous humor in front of the crystalline humor and the vitreous humor at the back. These, however, do not play as critical of a role in vision as the crystalline humor. The crystalline humor transmits the image it perceives to the brain through an optic nerve.

== Volumes ==
- Book I deals with al-Haytham's theories on light, colors, and vision.
- Book II is where al-Haytham presents his theory of visual perception.
- Book III presents al-Haytham's ideas on the errors in visual perception.
- Book VI focuses on errors related to reflection.
- Book V and Book VI provide experimental evidence for al-Haytham's theories on reflection.
- Book VII deals with the concept of refraction.

== Influence ==
The Book of Optics was translated into Latin by an unknown scholar at the end of the 12th (or the beginning of the 13th) century. The work was influential during the Middle Ages. It was printed by Friedrich Risner in 1572, as part of his collection Opticae thesaurus. This included a book on twilight falsely attributed to Alhazen, as well as a work on optics by Vitello.

== See also ==
- History of optics
- Ibn Sahl
- Scientific method

== English translations ==
- Sabra, A. I., ed. (1983), The Optics of Ibn al-Haytham, Books I–II–III: On Direct Vision. The Arabic text, edited and with Introduction, Arabic-Latin Glossaries and Concordance Tables, Kuwait: National Council for Culture, Arts and Letters
- Sabra, A. I., ed. (2002), The Optics of Ibn al-Haytham. Edition of the Arabic Text of Books IV–V: On Reflection and Images Seen by Reflection. 2 vols, Kuwait: The National Council for Culture, Arts and Letters
- The Optics of Ibn al-Haytham. Books I–II–III: On Direct Vision. English Translation and Commentary. 2 vols, Studies of the Warburg Institute, vol. 40, translated by Sabra, A. I., London: The Warburg Institute, University of London, 1989, ISBN 0-85481-072-2
- Smith, A. Mark, ed. (2001), "Alhacen's Theory of Visual Perception: A Critical Edition, with English Translation and Commentary, of the First Three Books of Alhacen's De Aspectibus, the Medieval Latin Version of Ibn al-Haytham's Kitāb al-Manāẓir, 2 vols.", Transactions of the American Philosophical Society, vol. 91, translated by Smith, Philadelphia: American Philosophical Society, ISBN 0-87169-914-1, OCLC 47168716 Books I–III (2001 – 91(4)) Vol. 1 Commentary and Latin text; – 91(5) Vol 2 English translation, Book I: TOC pp. 339–341, Book II: TOC pp. 415–416, Book III: TOC pp. 559–60, Notes 681ff, Bibl.
- Smith, A. Mark, ed. (2006), "Alhacen on the principles of reflection: A Critical Edition, with English Translation and Commentary, of books 4 and 5 of Alhacen's De Aspectibus, the Medieval Latin Version of Ibn al-Haytham's Kitāb al-Manāẓir, 2 vols.", Transactions of the American Philosophical Society, 95 (2–3), translated by Smith, Philadelphia: American Philosophical Society 2 vols: . (Philadelphia: American Philosophical Society), 2006 – 95(#2) Books 4–5 Vol. 1 Commentary and Latin text; 95(#3) Vol. 2 English translation, Notes, Bibl.
- Smith, A. Mark, ed. and trans. (2008) Alhacen on Image-formation and distortion in mirrors : a critical edition, with English translation and commentary, of Book 6 of Alhacen's De aspectibus, [the Medieval Latin version of Ibn al-Haytham's Kitāb al-Manāzir], Transactions of the American Philosophical Society, 2 vols: Vol. 1 98(#1, section 1 – Vol. 1 Commentary and Latin text); 98(#1, section 2 – Vol. 2 English translation). (Philadelphia: American Philosophical Society), 2008. Book 6 (2008) Vol. 1 Commentary and Latin text; Vol. 2 English translation, Notes, Bibl.
- Smith, A. Mark, ed. and trans. (2010) Alhacen on Refraction : a critical edition, with English translation and commentary, of Book 7 of Alhacen's De aspectibus, [the Medieval Latin version of Ibn al-Haytham's Kitāb al-Manāzir], Transactions of the American Philosophical Society, 2 vols: 100(#3, section 1 – Vol. 1, Introduction and Latin text); 100(#3, section 2 – Vol. 2 English translation). (Philadelphia: American Philosophical Society), 2010. Book 7 (2010) Vol. 1 Commentary and Latin text; Vol. 2 English translation, Notes, Bibl.
