= Kamāl al-Dīn al-Fārisī =

Persian mathematician (1265–1318)

Kamal al-Din al-Fārisī
- Born: 1265
- Died: 12 January 1318 (aged 52–53)
- Scientific career
- Fields: Optics, physics, mathematics, science

Kamal al-Din Hasan ibn Ali ibn Hasan al-Farisi or Abu Hasan Muhammad ibn Hasan (1267– 12 January 1319, long assumed to be 1320; Persian: كمال‌الدين فارسی) was a Persian Muslim scientist. He made two major contributions to science, one on optics, the other on number theory. Farisi was a pupil of the astronomer and mathematician Qutb al-Din al-Shirazi, who in turn was a pupil of Nasir al-Din Tusi.

According to Encyclopædia Iranica, Kamal al-Din was the most advanced Persian author on optics.

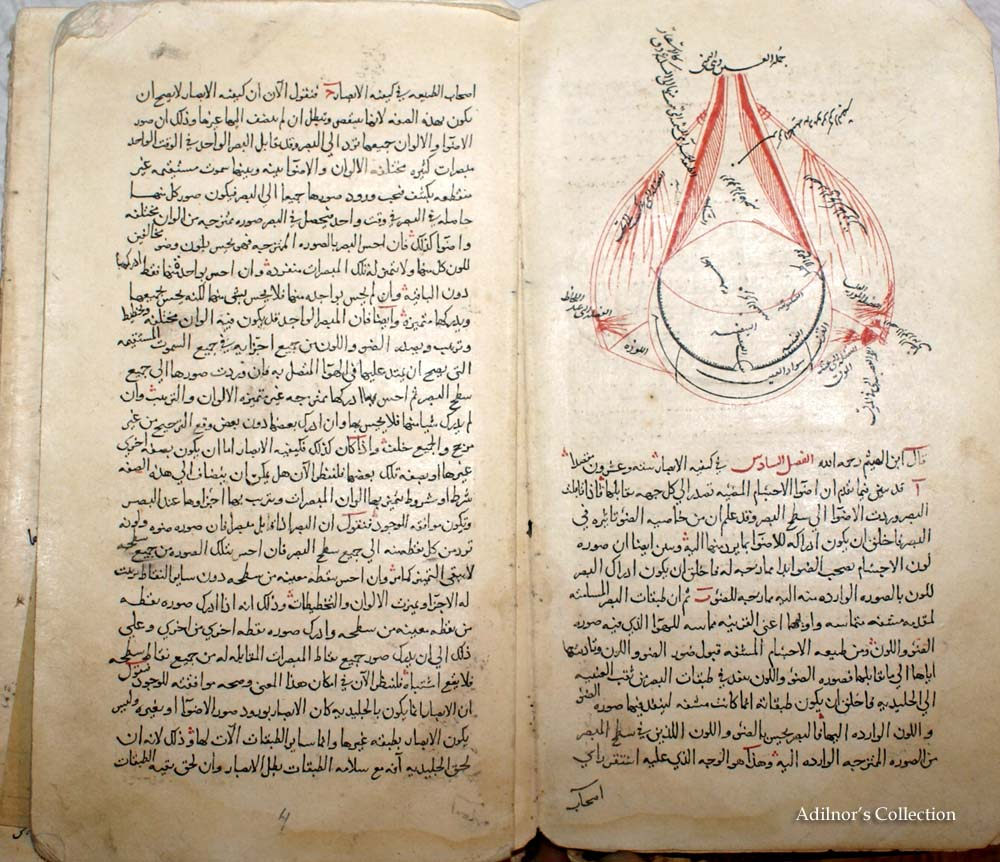
Kamal al-Din al-Farisi's autograph manuscript in Optics, Tanqih al-Manazir, 1309 A.D., Adilnor Collection.

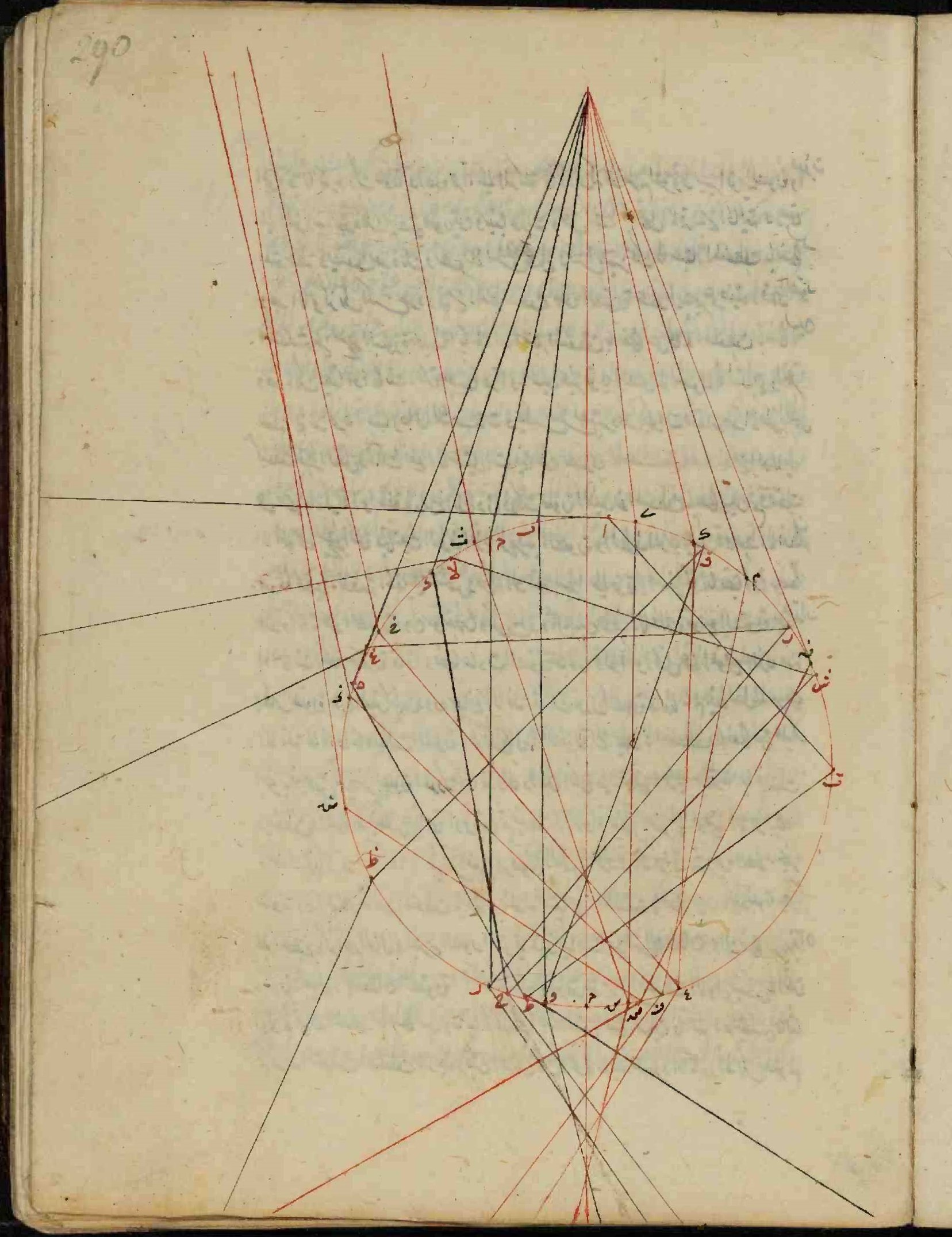
Kamāl al-Dīn al-Fārisī: Primary and secondary rainbow construction, around 1300. From Revision of the Optics of Ibn al-Haytham (Tanqīḥ al-Manāẓir li-Ḏawī'l-Abṣār wa'l-Baṣāʾir). The point light source is on top. A partial explanation, with the rays in red and black producing the primary and secondary rainbow, respectively.

== Optics ==
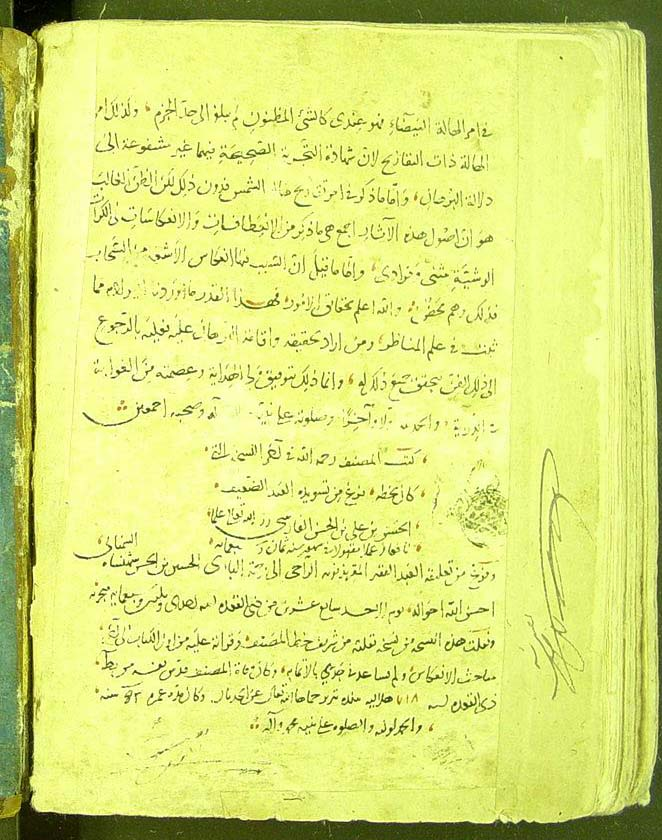
The colophone of Al-Basa'ir fi 'ilm al-Basa'ir, copied in 731 H.E. from Kamal al-Din's original manuscript, states that Kamal al-Din's real name is al-Hasan ibn Ali ibn al-Hasan and he has completed the work in 708 H.E. The scribe states also that Kamal al-Din died on 19 Dhu al-Qa'dah 718 H.E. (12 January 1319)

His work on optics was prompted by a question put to him concerning the refraction of light. Shirazi advised him to consult the Book of Optics of Ibn al-Haytham (Alhacen), and Farisi made such a deep study of this treatise that Shirazi suggested that he write what is essentially a revision of that major work, which came to be called the Tanqih. Qutb al-Din Al-Shirazi himself was writing a commentary on works of Avicenna at the time.

Farisi is known for giving the first mathematically satisfactory explanation of the rainbow, and an explication of the nature of colours that reformed the theory of Ibn al-Haytham Alhazen. Farisi also "proposed a model where the ray of light from the sun was refracted twice by a water droplet, one or more reflections occurring between the two refractions." He verified this through extensive experimentation using a transparent sphere filled with water and a camera obscura.

His research in this regard was based on theoretical investigations in dioptrics conducted on the so-called Burning Sphere (al-Kura al-muhriqa) in the tradition of Ibn Sahl (d. ca. 1000) and Ibn al-Haytham (d. ca. 1041) after him. As he noted in his Kitab Tanqih al-Manazir (The Revision of the Optics), Farisi used a large clear vessel of glass in the shape of a sphere, which was filled with water, in order to have an experimental large-scale model of a rain drop. He then placed this model within a camera obscura that has a controlled aperture for the introduction of light. He projected light unto the sphere and ultimately deducted through several trials and detailed observations of reflections and refractions of light that the colors of the rainbow are phenomena of the decomposition of light. His research had resonances with the studies of his contemporary Theodoric of Freiberg (without any contacts between them; even though they both relied on Ibn al-Haytham's legacy), and later with the experiments of Descartes and Newton in dioptrics (for instance, Newton conducted a similar experiment at Trinity College, though using a prism rather than a sphere).

In his Kitab Tanqih al-Manazir (The Revision of the Optics), Farisi also saved the latest advancements in color theory by Nasir al-Din al-Tusi on color ordering. In contrast to Aristotle (d. 322 BCE), who had suggested that all colors can be aligned on a single line from black to white, Ibn-Sina (d. 1037) had described that there were three paths from black to white, one path via grey, a second path via red and the third path via green. Al-Tusi (ca. 1258) elaborated on this by stating that there are no less than five of such paths, via lemon (yellow), blood (red), pistachio (green), indigo (blue) and grey. No less than 23 intermediate colors on these paths were explicitly mentioned in this text. Fortunately this text was saved since Farisi included it in his Kitab Tanqih al-Manazir (The Revision of the Optics), which was copied numerous times until at least the nineteenth century as part of the textbook Revision of the Optics (Tanqih al-Manazir). Tusi's description of the relations between various colors effectively made color space two-dimensional. Robert Grosseteste (d. 1253) proposed an effectively three-dimensional model of color space.

== Number theory ==
Farisi made a number of important contributions to number theory. His most impressive work in number theory is on amicable numbers. In Tadhkira al-ahbab fi bayan al-tahabb ("Memorandum for friends on the proof of amicability") introduced a major new approach to a whole area of number theory, introducing ideas concerning factorization and combinatorial methods. In fact Farisi's approach is based on the unique factorization of an integer into powers of prime numbers. While the Greek mathematician Euclid took the first step on the way to the existence of prime factorization, al-Farisi took the final step and stated for the first time the fundamental theorem of arithmetic.

== Works ==
- Asas al-qawa'id fi usul al-fawa'id (The base of the rules in the principles of uses) which comprises an introduction and five chapters dealing with arithmetic, notarial and sales rules, and the areas of surfaces and solids, while the last two essays are on algebra. The book is a commentary on the treatise of Al-Baha'i uses in the arithmetic rules of Al-Khawam al-Baghdadi.
- Tanqih al-Manazir (Arabic: تنقيح المناظر; The Revision of Ibn al-Haytham's Optics). He completed the writing of this book in Ramadan 708 H.E. (Feb-Mar 1309 A.D.). The autograph manuscript of this work has newly discovered. Before the discovery, the completion date of the Tanqih had been controversial, placed from sometime before 1290 (M. Nazif) to after 1302, but before Quṭb al-Dīn Shīrāzī's death in 710/1311 (Wiedemann).
- Tadhkira al-ahbab fi bayan al-tahabb (Memorandum for friends on the proof of amicability)
- Al-Basa'ir fi 'ilm al-manazir (Insights Into the Sciences of Optics), a textbook for students of optics, presenting the conclusion of the Tanqih without the proofs or experiments. He completed the writing of this book in 708 H.E. (1309 A.D.).

== See also ==
- List of Iranian scientists and scholars
