= Johannes Fleischer =

German theologian (1539–1593)

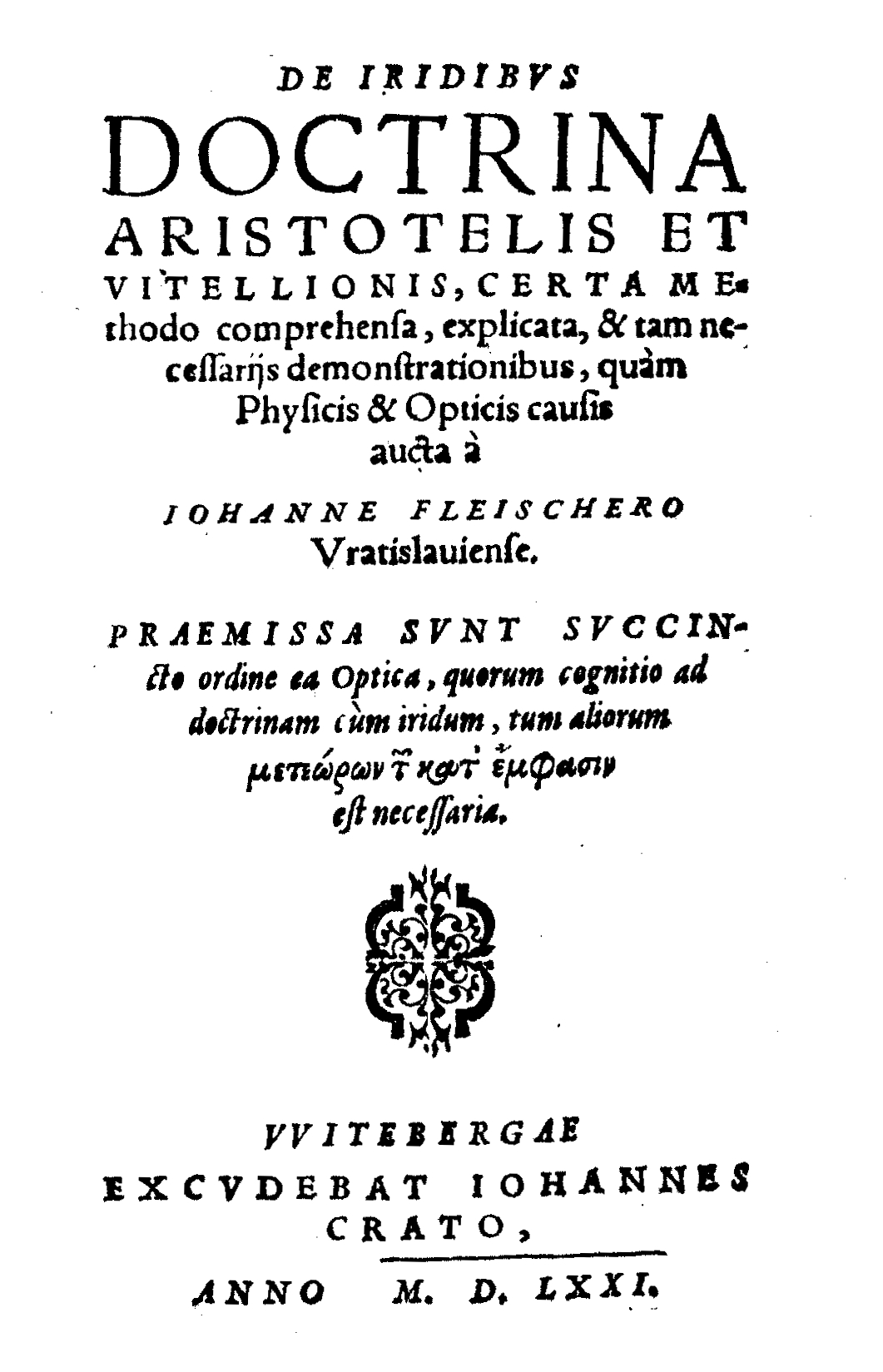
Title page of De iridibus doctrina Aristotelis et Vitellionis (1571)

Johannes Fleischer (29 March 1539 – 4 March 1593) was a Silesian humanist, Lutheran clergyman, and natural philosopher whose only published work was an examination of the formation of rainbows published in 1571 and was among the first to identify that both reflection and refraction were involved, although it drew on the earlier works of Vitello.

Fleischer was born in a wealthy family in Breslau where he studied at the Goldberg Gymnasium before going to Wittenberg. He studied under Philip Melancthon and matriculated in 1557 after which he continued to study Hebrew and theology apart from some astronomy. He received a doctorate in theology in 1589 and began to teach, first at the Goldberg Gymnasium and then at Breslau at the school of St. Elizabeth's Church while also holding clergy positions there and later at St. Maria Magdalena's Church. He published his De iridibus doctrina Aristotelis et Vitellionis (1571) in which he clarified the mechanisms of reflection and refraction involved although not within the same rain drop. He however continued with older traditions on the idea that colours were mixtures of brightness and darkness. He also held that secondary rainbows were caused by multiple layers of drops and that the colours were in the same order.
