= Fields of Force =

1974 book by William Berkson

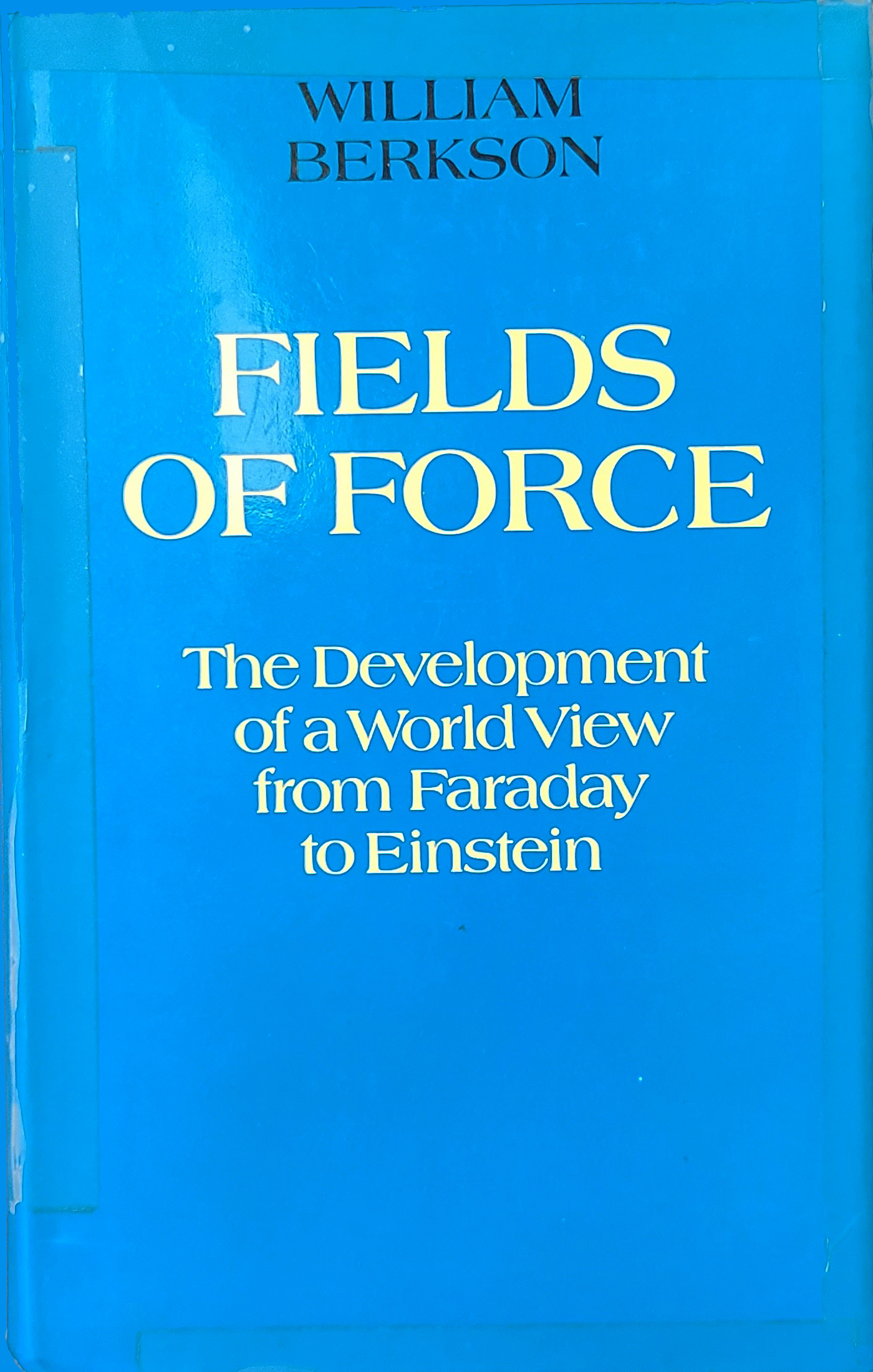
- Author: William Berkson
- Original title: Fields of Force: The Development of a world view from Faraday to Einstein
- Publisher: Routledge
- Publication date: 1974

Fields of Force: The Development of a world view from Faraday to Einstein is a book by William Berkson, published in 1974 by Routledge in the U.K. and John Wiley & Sons in the U.S.. It is an extension of his doctoral thesis, which was supervised by Karl Popper and examined by A.I. Sabra. Berkson credits the book with an influence from Joseph Agassi. It was republished in 2014 by Routledge, as part of their Library Editions: 20th Century Science. A Spanish Translation, Las teorías de los campos de fuerza was published in 1981 by Alianza Editorial.

== Summary ==
Fields of Force has a preface, an introduction, ten chapters, a historiographical appendix on field theory, and name and subject indexes. The introduction and the ten chapters all consist of 6 or more sections.

== Berkson on Field Theory ==
The book reconstructs theoretical frameworks originally used in building up the concept of a field. It shows that the field of Faraday's electricity and the field of Einstein's relativity are distinct; although both make different assumptions about physical reality, Berkson suggests that the assumptions of either conception of the field still remain as plausible today as when first conceived. These separate field theories share at least one significant and testable difference in comparison with Newtonian physics: whereas Newton's action-at-a-distance occurs instantaneously, the field theories predict a propagation delay. Berkson explains that Faraday's prediction of a physically measurable propagation delay (finite velocity) from his own conception of a physical field permeating space is one important difference separating this idea from that of Newton's (infinite velocity).

All these field theories (Eintstein's, Faraday's, and Maxwell's) remain inconsistent with quantum mechanics. For they assume nature to be continuous, while quantum theory assumes it to be discrete.
