= Eyebeam =

Eyebeam may refer to:

- Eye beam, an emission theory of sight
- Eyebeam (comic), a daily comic strip written and illustrated by Sam Hurt
- eyeBeam (software), a VoIP softphone developed by CounterPath Corporation
- Eyebeam (organization), a not-for-profit arts and technology center based in New York City
- I-beam, a beam with an I- or H-shaped cross-section

== See also ==
Heat vision - In comics (most notably Superman), the ability to burn something just by looking at it is usually depicted as beams of red energy emanating from the eyes
