= A. I. Sabra =

Egyptian historian of science (1924–2013)

- عبد الحميد إبراهيم صبرة
- Born: Abdelhamid Ibrahim Sabra; July 8, 1924; Tanta, Kingdom of Egypt
- Died: December 18, 2013 (aged 89); Lexington, Massachusetts
- Other name: Bashi
- Citizenship: Egypt, United States of America
- Education: Alexandria University; London School of Economics
- Children: Adam Sabra
- Awards: George Sarton Medal (2005)
- Scientific career
- Fields: History of science
- Thesis: Theories Of Light from Descartes To Newton (1955)
- Doctoral advisor: Karl Popper

Abdelhamid Ibrahim Sabra (1924–2013) was a professor of the history of science specializing in the history of optics and science in medieval Islam. He died December 18, 2013. Sabra provided English translation and commentary for Books I-III of Ibn al-Haytham's seven book Kitab al-Manazir (Book of Optics), written in Arabic in the 11th century.

Sabra received his undergraduate degree at the University of Alexandria. He then studied philosophy of science with Karl Popper at the University of London, where he received a PhD in 1955 for a thesis on optics in the 17th century. He taught at the University of Alexandria 1955–62, at the Warburg Institute 1962–72, and at Harvard University from 1972 until he retired in 1996.

In his article on "The Appropriation and Subsequent Naturalization of Greek Science in Medieval Islam", he argued, against the theories of Pierre Duhem, that Islamic cultures did not passively receive and preserve ancient Greek science, but actively "appropriated" and modified it.

In 2005 he was awarded the Sarton Medal for lifetime achievement in the history of science by the History of Science Society.

== Select publications ==
- 1954. "A Note on a Suggested Modification of Newton's Corpuscular Theory of Light to Reconcile it with Foucault's Experiment of 1850." British Journal for the Philosophy of Science 5, pp. 149–51.
- 1967 Theories of Light from Descartes to Newton, (Oldbourne), (reprint Cambridge University Press, 1981), 363 pages.
- 1984. "The Andalusian Revolt Against Ptolemaic Astronomy: Averroes and al-Bitrûjî." pp. 233–53 in Everett Mendelsohn, editor, Transformation and Tradition in the Sciences: Essays in honor of I. Bernard Cohen. Cambridge: Cambridge University Press.
- 1987. "The Appropriation and Subsequent Naturalization of Greek Science in Medieval Islam." History of Science 25, pp. 223–43.
- 1996. "Situating Arabic Science: Locality versus Essence," Isis, 87, pp. 654–670 (reprinted in Michael H. Shank, ed., The Scientific Enterprise in Antiquity and the Middle Ages. Chicago: University of Chicago Press, 2000, pp. 215–31).
