= Eye beam =

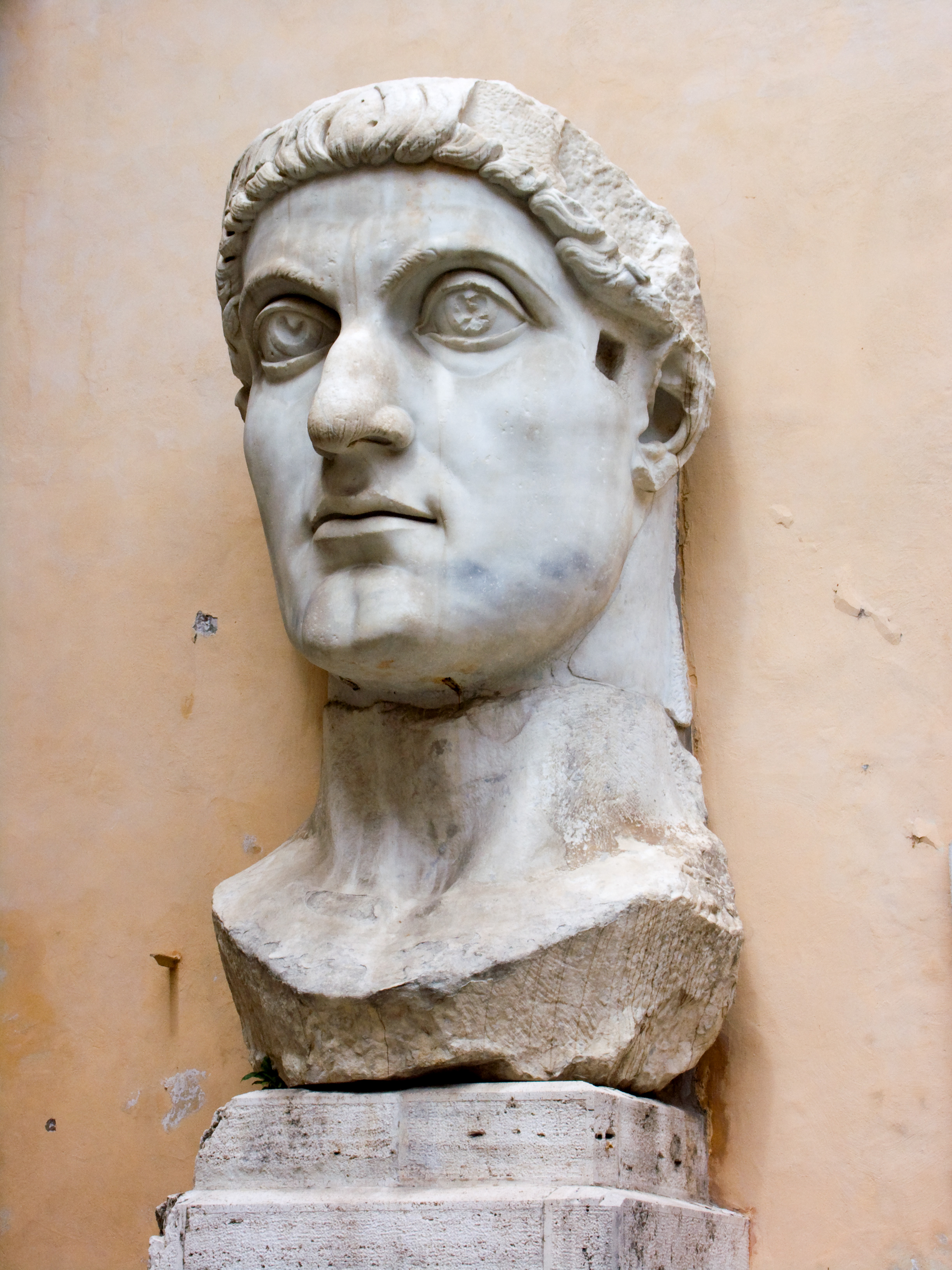
The colossal head of Constantine the Great (Capitoline Museums)

In Platonic physics and the emission theory of sight, an eye beam generated in the eye was thought to be responsible for the sense of sight. The concept originated in the writings of Plato, but was rejected by Aristotle. Aristotle understood sight correctly, as depending on externally intromitted light. The exaggerated eyes of busts of fourth-century Roman emperors like Constantine the Great reflect this character.

The emission theory seemed to be corroborated by geometry and was reinforced by Robert Grosseteste.

== Modern era ==
The King James Daemonologie uses eye beams in a suggested scientific explanation for the phenomenon of invisibility supposedly made possible through witchcraft.

[W]hy may he [The Devil] not far easilier thicken & obscure so the air, that is next about them by contracting it strait together, that the beames of any other mans eyes, cannot pearce thorow the same, to see them?

The concept found expression in poetry into the 17th century, most famously in John Donne's poem "The Extasie":

Our eye-beams twisted, and did thred
Our eyes, upon one double string;
So to'entergraft our hands, as yet
Was all the meanes to make us one,
And pictures in our eyes to get
Was all our propagation.

In the same period John Milton wrote, of having gone blind, "When I consider how my light is spent", meaning that he had lost the capacity to generate eye beams.

Later in the century, Newtonian optics and increased understanding of the structure of the eye rendered the old concept invalid, but it was revived as an aspect of monstrous superhuman capabilities in popular culture of the 20th century.

In Algernon Swinburne's "Atalanta in Calydon" the conception is revived for poetic purposes, enriching the poem's pagan context in the Huntsman's invocation of Artemis:

Hear now and help, and lift no violent hand,
But favourable and fair as thine eye's beam,
Hidden and shown in heaven".

In T. S. Eliot's rose garden episode that introduces "Burnt Norton" eyebeams persist in the fusion of possible pasts and presents like unheard music:

The unheard music hidden in the shrubbery
And the unseen eyebeam crossed, for the roses
Had the look of flowers that are looked at.

The New Zealand poet Edward Tregear instanced "the lurid eye-beam of the angry Bull"— Taurus of the zodiac— among the familiar stars above the alien wilderness of New Zealand.

In computer graphics, the concept of eye beams is resurrected in ray casting in which the bouncing of rays of light cast from a viewpoint around a scene is simulated computationally.

== See also ==
- Emission theory (vision)
