= Emission theory (vision) =

Theory that eyes emit beams for vision

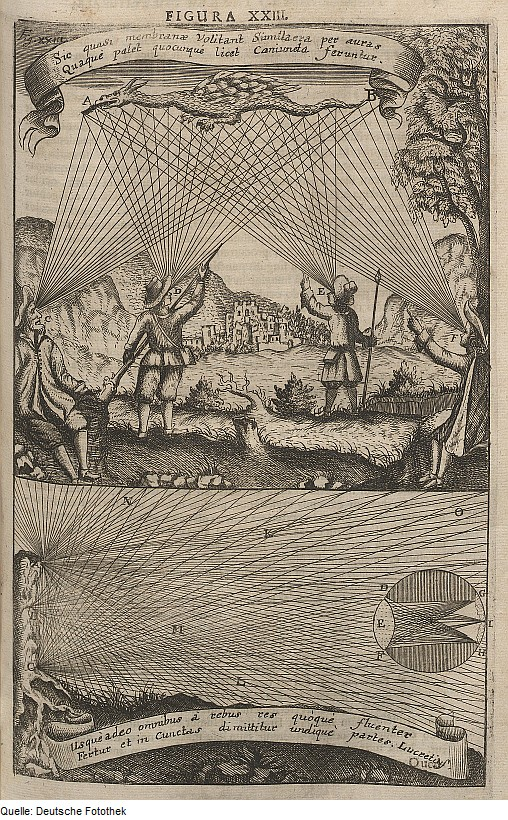
Illustration from System der visuellen Wahrnehmung beim Menschen (1687) depicting emission theory.

Emission theory or extramission theory (variants: extromission) or extromissionism is the proposal that visual perception is accomplished by eye beams emitted by the eyes. This theory has been replaced by intromission theory (or intromissionism), which is that visual perception comes from something representative of the object (later established to be rays of light reflected from it) entering the eyes. Modern physics has confirmed that light is physically transmitted by photons from a light source, such as the sun, to visible objects, and finishing with the detector, such as a human eye or camera.

== History ==
In the fifth century BC, Empedocles postulated that everything was composed of four elements; fire, air, earth, and water. He believed that Aphrodite made the human eye out of the four elements and that she lit the fire in the eye which shone out from the eye, making sight possible. If this were true, then one could see during the night just as well as during the day, so Empedocles postulated that there were two different types of emanations that interacted in some way: one that emanated from an object to the eye, and another that emanated from the eye to an object. He compared these outward-flowing emanations to the emission of light from a lantern.

Around 400 BC, emission theory was held by Plato.

Around 300 BC, Euclid wrote Optics and Catoptrics, in which he studied the properties of sight. Euclid postulated that the visual ray emitted from the eye travelled in straight lines, described the laws of reflection, and mathematically studied the appearance of objects by direct vision and by reflection.

Ptolemy (c. 2nd century) wrote Optics, a work marking the culmination of the ancient Greek optics, in which he developed theories of direct vision (optics proper), vision by reflection (catoptics), and, notably, vision by refraction (dioptrics).

Galen, also in the 2nd century, likewise endorsed the extramission theory (De Usu Partium Corporis Humani). His theory contained anatomical and physiological details which could not be found in the works of mathematicians and philosophers. Due to this feature and his medical authority, his view held considerable influence in the pre-modern Middle East and Europe, especially among medical doctors in these regions.

== Evidence for the theory ==
Adherents of emission theory cited at least two lines of evidence for it.

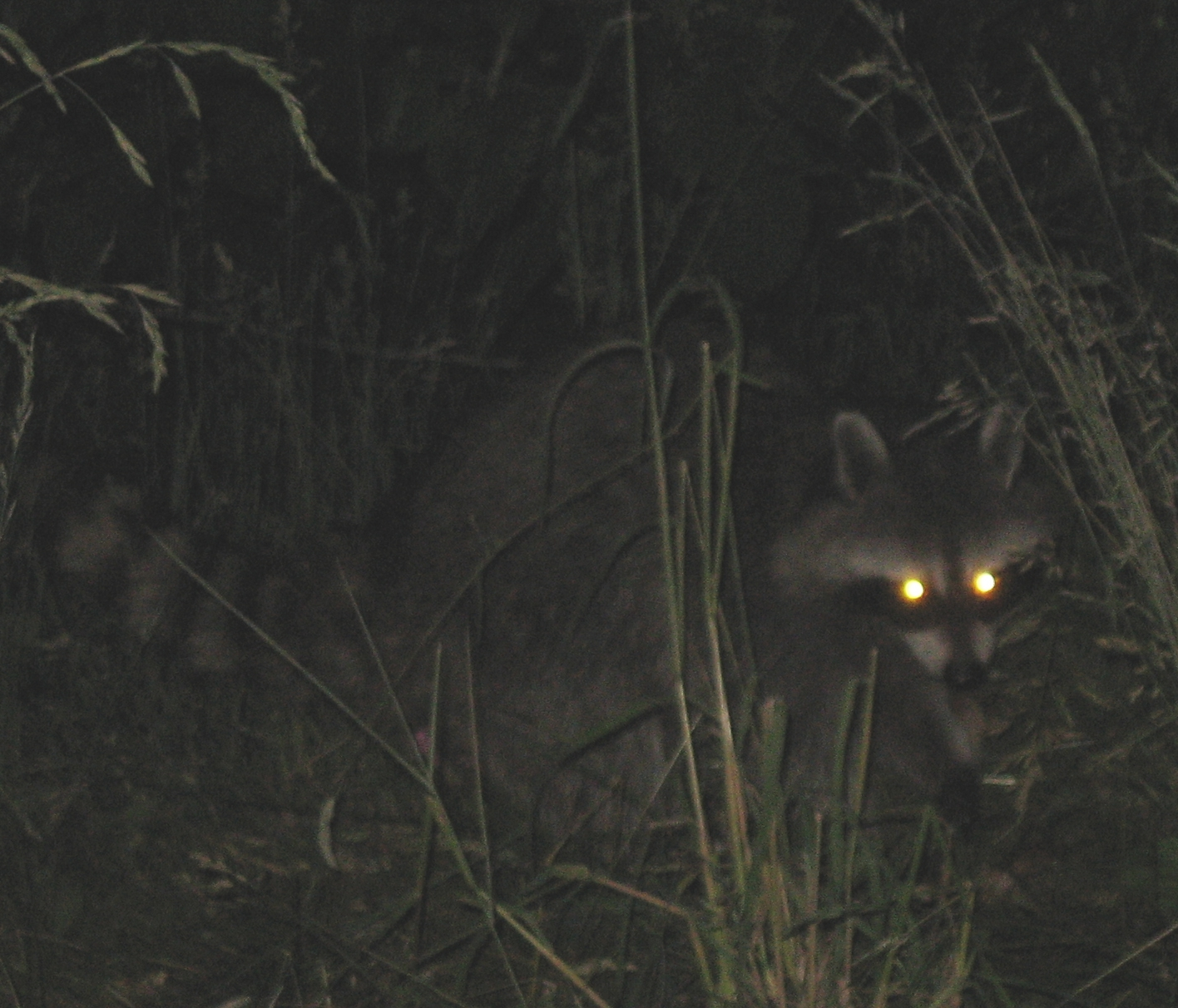
A raccoon's eyes brightly reflect a camera flash

The light from the eyes of some animals (such as cats, which modern science has determined have highly reflective eyes) could also be seen in "darkness". Adherents of intromission theory countered by saying that if emission theory were true, then someone with weak eyes should have their vision improved when someone with good eyes looks at the same objects.

Some argued that Euclid's version of emission theory was purely metaphorical, highlighting mainly the geometrical relations between eyes and objects. The geometry of classical optics is equivalent no matter which direction light is considered to move because light is modeled by its path, not as a moving object. However, his theory of clarity of vision (the circular appearance of far rectangular objects) makes sense only if the ray emits from eyes. Alternatively, Euclid's can be interpreted as a mathematical model whose only constraint was to save the phenomena, without the need of a strict correspondence between each theoretical entity and a physical counterpart.

Measuring the speed of light was one line of evidence that spelled the end of emission theory as anything other than a metaphor.

== Refutation ==
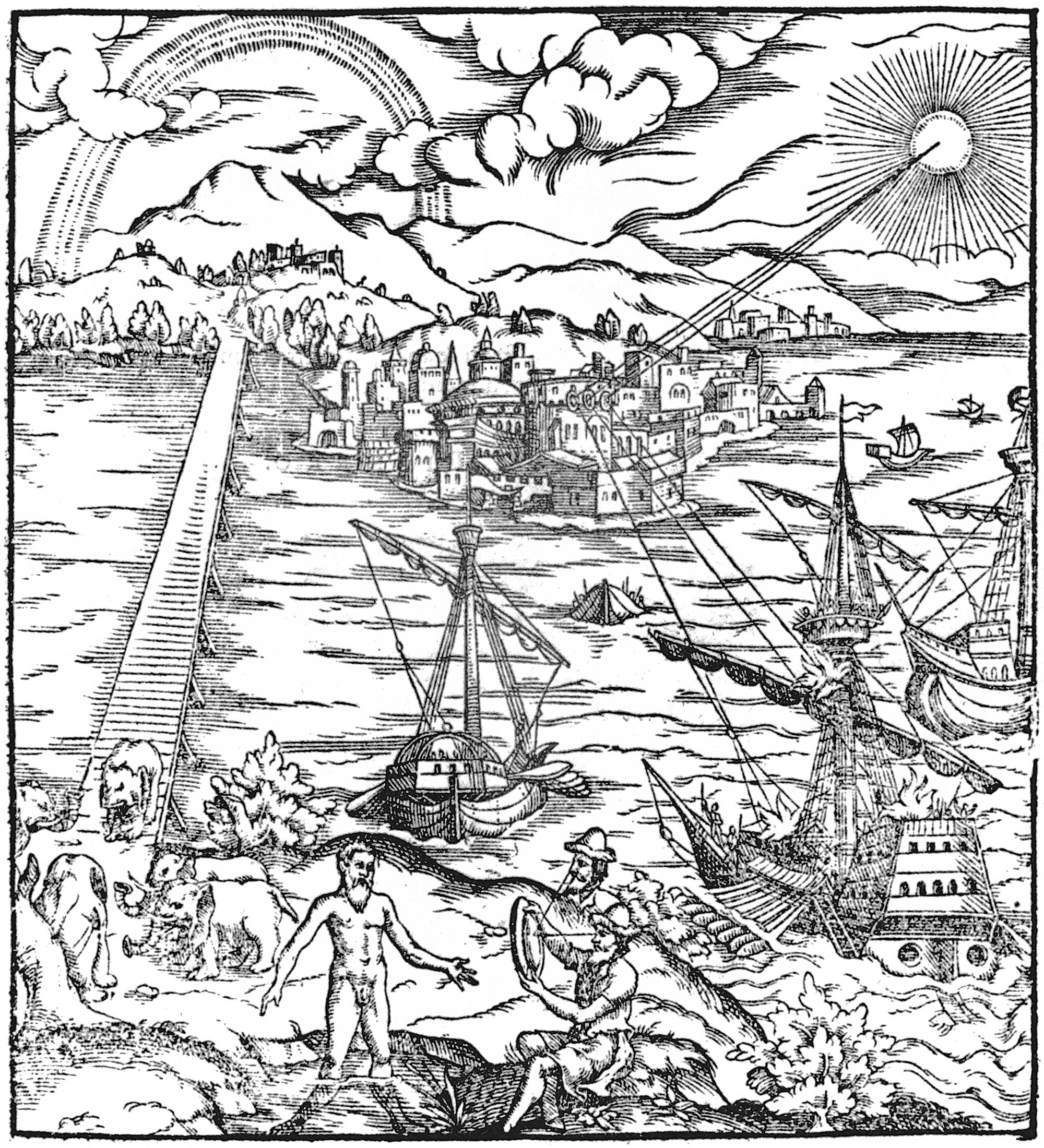
Front page of the Opticae Thesaurus, which included the first printed Latin translation of Alhazen's Book of Optics. The illustration incorporates many examples of optical phenomena including perspective effects, the rainbow, mirrors, and refraction.

Alhazen was the first person to explain that vision occurs when light reflects from an object into one's eyes.

The rise of physics in the 17th century led to a novel version of the intromissionist theory that proved extremely influential and displaced any legacies of the old emissive theories. In Cartesian physics, light was the sensation of pressure emitted by surrounding objects that sought to move, as transmitted through the rotatory motion of material corpuscles. These views extended to Isaac Newton's corpuscular theory of light, and would be adopted by John Locke and other the 18th-century luminaries.

== Persistence of the theory ==
Winer et al. (2002) have found evidence that as many as 50% of adult college students believe in emission theory.

Rupert Sheldrake claims to have found evidence for emission theory through his experiments in the sense of being stared at.

== Relationship with echolocation ==
Sometimes, the emission theory is explained by analogy with echolocation and sonar. For example, in explaining Ptolemy's theory, a psychologist stated:

Ptolemy’s ‘extramission’ theory of vision proposed scaling the angular size of objects using light rays that were emitted by the eyes and reflected back by objects. In practice some animals (bats, dolphins, whales, and even some birds and rodents) have evolved what is effectively an ‘extramission’ theory of audition to address this very concern.

Note this account of the Ptolemaic theory ('bouncing back of visual ray') differs from ones found in other sources.

== See also ==
- Ray tracing
