= Janus (journal) =

French language science history journal (1896 to 1990)

Janus was an academic journal published in Amsterdam in the French language from 1896 to 1990, devoted to the history of medicine and the history of science. It should not be confused with a different journal by the same name on the history of medicine, published roughly 50 years earlier in Germany as Janus, Zeitschrift für Geschichte und Literatur der Medicin.

== Founding and early history ==
The journal was founded in 1896 by Carel Eduard Daniëls and Hendrik Peypers, with the French subtitle Archives internationales pour l'histoire de la médecine et la géographie médicale [International Archive for the History of Medicine and Medical Geography]. In his 1895 doctoral dissertation in history, Peypers had already quoted Schlegel concerning the Janus-like viewpoint of the historian, "the prophet who also looks backwards":

Of er wel voor de herleving van den zin voor geschiedenis ten onzent kans bestaat? Het ziet er in dit opzicht droevig genoeg uit. Voor den historicus, een Janus, geen godheid wel is waar, maar een "Prophet der auch rückwärts schaut," schijnt in ons land geen plaats te zijn.

From 1915 onward, the journal called itself the organe de la société historique néerlandaise des sciences médicales, exactes et naturelles [journal of the Dutch Society for the History of Medical, Exact, and Natural Sciences]. The society was founded at the same time as the journal, and existed primarily to publish the journal. This series of the journal ended in 1941, interrupted by World War II.

== Post-war revival ==
In 1957, the same journal was restarted, this time subtitled revue internationale de l'histoire des sciences, de la médecine, de la pharmacie et de la technique [International Review for the History of Science, Medicine, Pharmacy, and Technology]. It had Evert Marie Bruins as co-editor; Bruins had recently returned to Amsterdam from teaching mathematics in Baghdad, and in 1969 he would be named professor of the history of mathematics at the University of Amsterdam. In 1963 he took over full editorship of the journal. Under the influence of Bruins, the journal began including the history of mathematics in its repertoire of topics.

Bruins died in 1990, and his journal ceased publication in the same year.
