= Adam Sabra =

Professor of Islamic studies

- Born: c.1968 (age 57–58)
- Education: Harvard University, Princeton University
- Occupation: professor of Islamic Studies
- Employer: University of California, Santa Barbara (UCSB)
- Known for: King Abdul Aziz Ibn Saud Chair in Islamic Studies at UCSB
- Notable work: see Selected publications

Adam Sabra (born c.1968) is a historian of the Middle East at the University of California, Santa Barbara.

== Education and career ==
Sabra was an undergraduate at Harvard University, where he majored in Near Eastern Languages and Civilizations and specialized in Islamic Studies. He graduated in 1990, and continued at Princeton University, receiving a master's degree in 1994 and completing his Ph.D. in 1998.

After short-term positions at Drew University, Sarah Lawrence College, and the University of Michigan, he became an assistant professor at Western Michigan University in 2002. He moved to the University of Georgia in 2006 and was tenured there in 2008. Since 2012 he has been professor and King Abdul Aziz Ibn Saud Chair in Islamic Studies at the University of California, Santa Barbara.

== Selected publications ==
- Poverty and Charity in Medieval Islam: Mamluk Egypt, 1250-1517. Cambridge: Cambridge University Press, 2000 (paperback edition)
- With Roxani Eleni Margariti and Petra M. Sijpesteijn (eds.), Histories of the Middle East: Studies in Middle Eastern Society, Economy and Law in Honor of A. L. Udovitch. Leiden: Brill, 2010.
- With Richard J. McGregor (eds.), Le développement du soufisme en Égypte à l’époque mamlouke. Cairo: Institut Français d'Archéologie Orientale, 2006.
- “Ibn Hazm’s Literalism: A Critique of Islamic Legal Theory,” in al-Qantara, XXVIII/1 (enero-junio 2007), pp. 7–40, XXVIII/2 (julio-diciembre 2007), pp. 307–348.
- The Guidebook for Gullible Jurists and Mendicants to the Conditions for Befriending Emirs and, The Abbreviated Guidebook for Gullible Jurists and Mendicants to the Conditions for Befriending Emirs by ‘Abd al-Wahhāb ibn Aḥmad ‘Alī al-Sha‘rānī
- With Mustafa y Sabra Mughazy (eds.), Kitāb Dustūr al-gharāʾib wa-maʿdan al-raghāʾib and Related Texts. The Correspondence (Inshāʾ) of Muḥammad ibn Abī al-Ḥasan al-Bakrī al-Ṣiddīqī (930-994/1524-1586), Bonn University Press, 2020
