= Vitello =

Polish scholar (c. 1230–1280/1314)

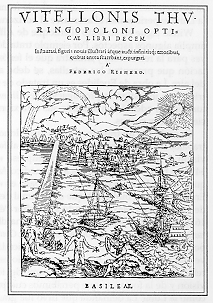
Cover of Vitellonis Thuringopoloni opticae libri decem (Ten Books of Optics by the Thuringo-Pole Witelo)

Vitello (Polish: Witelon; German: Witelo; c. 1230 – 1280/1314) was a Polish friar, scientist, theologian, natural philosopher and an important figure in the history of philosophy in Poland.

== Name ==
Vitello's name varies with some sources. In earlier publications he was quoted as Erazmus Ciolek Witelo, Erazm Ciołek, Vitellio and Vitulon. Today, he is usually referred to by his Latin name Vitello Thuringopolonis, often shortened to Vitello.

== Life ==
Vitello's exact birth-name and birthplace are uncertain. He was most likely born around 1230 in Silesia, in the vicinity of Legnica. His mother came from a Polish knightly house, while his father was a German settler from Thuringia. He called himself, in Latin, "Thuringorum et Polonorum filius" – "a son of Thuringians and Poles." He studied at Padua University about 1260, then went on to Viterbo. He became friends with William of Moerbeke, the translator of Aristotle from Greek language into Latin. Vitello's major surviving work on optics, Perspectiva, completed in about 1270–78, was dedicated to William. In 1284 he described the reflection and refraction of light.

== Perspectiva ==
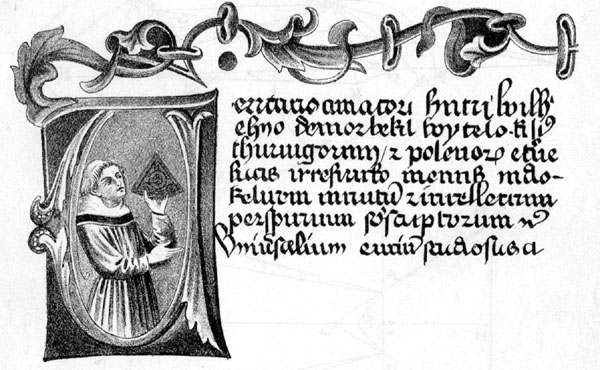
Page from a manuscript of De Perspectiva, with miniature of its author Vitello.

Vitello's Perspectiva was largely based on the work of the polymath Alhazen (Ibn al-Haytham; d. ca. 1041) and Robert Grosseteste, and he in turn influenced later scientists, in particular Johannes Kepler. Vitello's treatise in optics was closely linked to the Latin version of Ibn al-Haytham's Arabic opus: Kitab al-Manazir (The Book of Optics; De aspectibus or Perspectivae), and both were printed in the Friedrich Risner edition Opticae thesaurus (Basel, 1572).

Vitello's Perspectiva, which rested on Ibn al-Haytham's research in optics, influenced also the Renaissance theories of perspective. Lorenzo Ghiberti's Commentario terzo (Third Commentary) was based on an Italian translation of Vitello's Latin Perspectiva.

Vitello's treatise also contains much material in psychology, outlining views that are close to modern notions on the association of ideas and on the subconscious.

Perspectiva also includes Platonic metaphysical discussions. Vitello argues that there are intellectual and corporeal bodies, connected by causality (corresponding to the Idealist doctrine of the universal and the actual), emanating from God in the form of Divine Light. Light itself is, for Vitello, the first of all sensible entities, and his views on light are similar to those held by Roger Bacon, though he is closer in this to Alhazen's legacy.

== Other works ==
In Perspectiva, Vitello refers to other works that he had written. Most of these do not survive, but De natura daemonum and De primaria causa paenitentiae have been recovered.

== Legacy ==
The lunar crater Vitello is named after him.

== See also ==
- History of philosophy in Poland
- List of Poles
- List of Catholic clergy scientists
