= Friedrich Risner =

German mathematician (c. 1533–1580)

Friedrich Risner (Latin: Fridericus Risnerus; c.1533 – 15 September 1580) was a German mathematician from Hersfeld, Hesse. He was an assistant to Petrus Ramus (from around 1565) and was the first chair of mathematics at Collège Royale de France (1576).

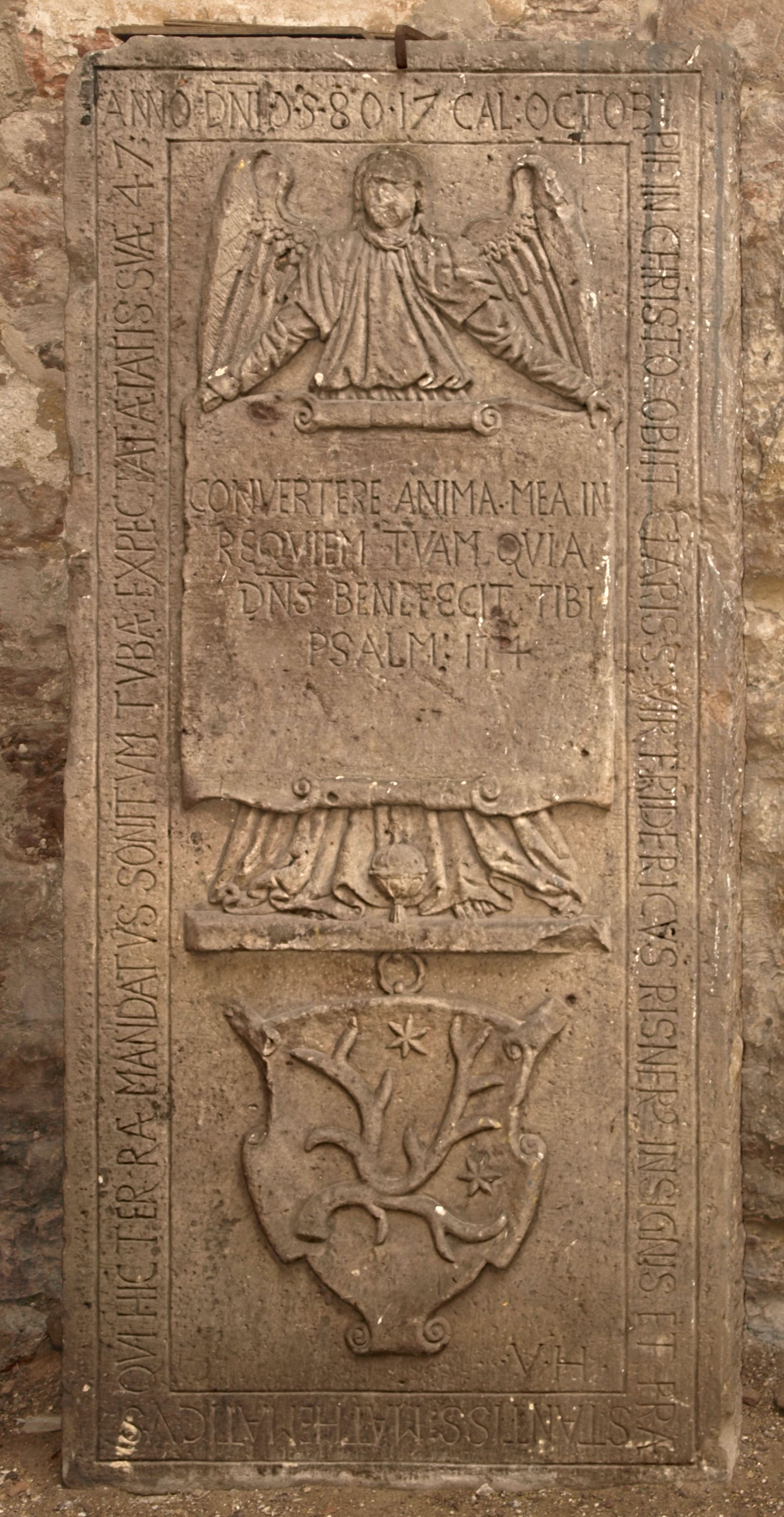
Risner's gravestone in Hersfeld Abbey

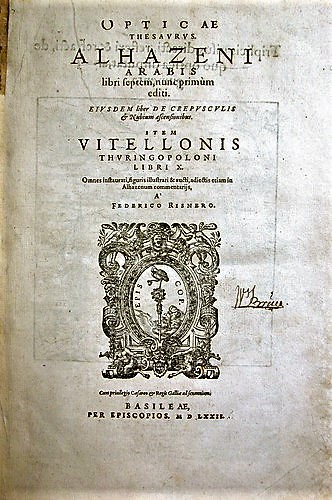
Front cover of Risner's Opticae thesaurus: Alhazeni Arabis libri septem, nuncprimum editi; Eiusdem liber De Crepusculis et nubium ascensionibus, Item Vitellonis Thuringopoloni libri X, 1572.

Risner is known for his 1572 publication of Opticae thesaurus: Alhazeni Arabis libri septem, nuncprimum editi; Eiusdem liber De Crepusculis et nubium ascensionibus, Item Vitellonis Thuringopoloni libri X (Optical Treasure: Seven books of Alhazen the Arab, published for the first time; His book On Twilight and the Rising of Clouds, Also of Vitello Thuringopoloni book X), an edition of works by Ibn al-Haitham (Alhazen) and Erazmus Ciołek Witelo (Vitello), two men who were both early pioneers in the field of optics. The publication became a major benefit to a number of mathematicians and scientists, such as Kepler, Snellius, Descartes and Huygens

He was the first to propose the idea of a portable camera obscura, which purportedly was to be used as an aid in the creation of artistic works. His idea consisted of a lightweight wooden hut that had small holes fitted with lenses in each wall, and a cube of paper placed in the centre for drawing.

After St. Bartholomew's Day massacre, Risner fled back to Hersfeld and died there eight years later. Risner was buried in Hersfeld Abbey, where his gravestone is well preserved.

The Latin circumscription on the gravestone is: Anno Domini 1580. 17. Cal. Octob. pie in Christo obiit clariss. vir Fridericus Risner insignis et praestantissimus Mathematicus qui hic terrae mandatus sonitum tubae expectat aetatis suae 47.

The English translation of the inscription reads: "In the year 1580 on the 15th of September, died in Christ at the age of 47, the well famous Friedrich Risner, an outstanding, excellent mathematician, who passed to soil here, will expect the sound of trumpet."
