= Physics in the medieval Islamic world =

The natural sciences saw various advancements during the Golden Age of Islam (from roughly the mid 8th to the mid 13th centuries), adding a number of innovations to the Transmission of the Classics (such as Aristotle, Ptolemy, Euclid, Neoplatonism). During this period, Islamic theology was encouraging of thinkers to find knowledge. Thinkers from this period included Al-Farabi, Abu Bishr Matta, Ibn Sina, al-Hassan Ibn al-Haytham and Ibn Bajjah. These works and the important commentaries on them were the wellspring of science during the medieval period. They were translated into Arabic, the lingua franca of this period.

Islamic scholarship in the sciences had inherited Aristotelian physics from the Greeks and during the Islamic Golden Age developed it further. However the Islamic world had a greater respect for knowledge gained from empirical observation, and believed that the universe is governed by a single set of laws. Their use of empirical observation led to the formation of crude forms of the scientific method. The study of physics in the Islamic world started in Iraq and Egypt. Fields of physics studied in this period include optics, mechanics (including statics, dynamics, kinematics and motion), and astronomy.

== Physics ==
Islamic scholarship had inherited Aristotelian physics from the Greeks and during the Islamic Golden Age developed it further, especially placing emphasis on observation and a priori reasoning, developing early forms of the scientific method. With Aristotelian physics, physics was seen as lower than demonstrative mathematical sciences, but in terms of a larger theory of knowledge, physics was higher than astronomy; many of whose principles derive from physics and metaphysics. The primary subject of physics, according to Aristotle, was motion or change; there were three factors involved with this change, underlying thing, privation, and form. In his Metaphysics, Aristotle believed that the Unmoved Mover was responsible for the movement of the cosmos, which Neoplatonists later generalized as the cosmos were eternal. Al-Kindi argued against the idea of the cosmos being eternal by claiming that the eternality of the world lands one in a different sort of absurdity involving the infinite; Al-Kindi asserted that the cosmos must have a temporal origin because traversing an infinite was impossible.

One of the first commentaries of Aristotle's Metaphysics is by Al-Farabi. In "'The Aims of Aristotle's Metaphysics", Al-Farabi argues that metaphysics is not specific to natural beings, but at the same time, metaphysics is higher in universality than natural beings.

== Optics ==
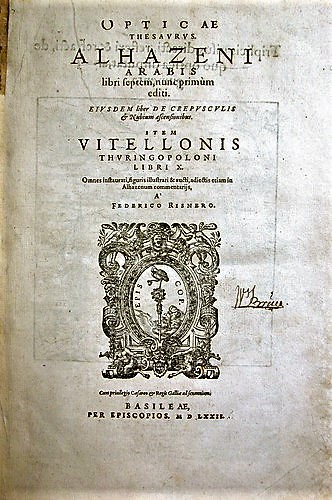
Cover of Ibn al-Haytham's Book of Optics

One field in physics, optics, developed rapidly in this period. By the ninth century, there were works on physiological optics as well as mirror reflections, and geometrical and physical optics. In the eleventh century, Ibn al-Haytham not only rejected the Greek idea about vision, he came up with a new theory.

Ibn Sahl (c. 940–1000), a mathematician and physicist connected with the court of Baghdad, wrote a treatise On Burning Mirrors and Lenses in 984 in which he set out his understanding of how curved mirrors and lenses bend and focus light. Ibn Sahl is credited with discovering the law of refraction, now usually called Snell's law. He used this law to work out the shapes of lenses that focus light with no geometric aberrations, known as anaclastic lenses.

Ibn al-Haytham (known in Western Europe as Alhacen or Alhazen) (965-1040), often regarded as the "father of optics" and a pioneer of the scientific method, formulated "the first comprehensive and systematic alternative to Greek optical theories." He postulated in his "Book of Optics" that light was reflected upon different surfaces in different directions, thus causing different light signatures for a certain object that we see. It was a different approach than that which was previously thought by Greek scientists, such as Euclid or Ptolemy, who believed rays were emitted from the eye to an object and back again. Al-Haytham, with this new theory of optics, was able to study the geometric aspects of the visual cone theories without explaining the physiology of perception. Also in his Book of Optics, Ibn al-Haytham used mechanics to try to understand optics. Using projectiles, he observed that objects that hit a target perpendicularly exert much more force than projectiles that hit at an angle. Al-Haytham applied this discovery to optics and tried to explain why direct light hurts the eye, because direct light approaches perpendicularly and not at an oblique angle. He developed a camera obscura to demonstrate that light and color from different candles can be passed through a single aperture in straight lines, without intermingling at the aperture. His theories were transmitted to the West. His work influenced Roger Bacon, John Peckham and Vitello, who built upon his work and ultimately transmitted it to Kepler.

Taqī al-Dīn tried to disprove the widely held belief that light is emitted by the eye and not the object that is being observed. He explained that, if light came from our eyes at a constant velocity it would take much too long to illuminate the stars for us to see them while we are still looking at them, because they are so far away. Therefore, the illumination must be coming from the stars so we can see them as soon as we open our eyes.

== Astronomy ==
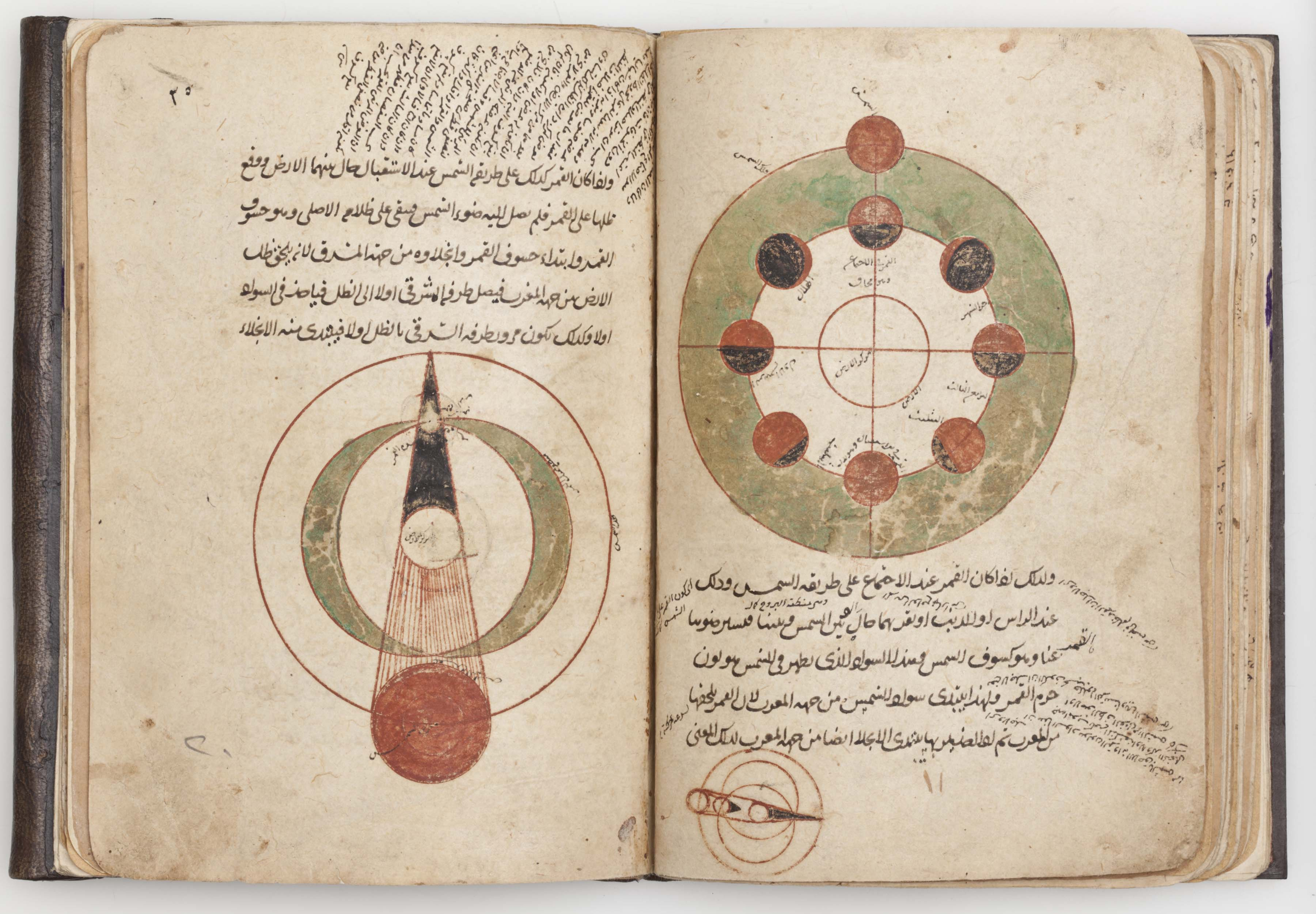
14th century manuscript of al-Mulakhkhas fi al-Hay’ah, Jaghmini's treatise on astronomy

The Islamic understanding of the astronomical model was based on the Greek Ptolemaic system. However, many early astronomers had started to question the model. It was not always accurate in its predictions and was over complicated because astronomers were trying to mathematically describe the movement of the heavenly bodies. Ibn al-Haytham published Al-Shukuk ala Batiamyus ("Doubts on Ptolemy"), which outlined his many criticisms of the Ptolemaic paradigm. This book encouraged other astronomers to develop new models to explain celestial movement better than Ptolemy. In al-Haytham's Book of Optics he argues that the celestial spheres were not made of solid matter, and that the heavens are less dense than air. Some astronomers theorized about gravity too, al-Khazini suggests that the gravity an object contains varies depending on its distance from the center of the universe. The center of the universe in this case refers to the center of the Earth.

== Mechanics ==
=== Impetus ===
John Philoponus had rejected the Aristotelian view of motion, and argued that an object acquires an inclination to move when it has a motive power impressed on it. In the eleventh century Ibn Sina had roughly adopted this idea, believing that a moving object has force which is dissipated by external agents like air resistance. Ibn Sina made distinction between 'force' and 'inclination' (called "mayl"), he claimed that an object gained mayl when the object is in opposition to its natural motion. So he concluded that continuation of motion is attributed to the inclination that is transferred to the object, and that object will be in motion until the mayl is spent. He also claimed that projectile in a vacuum would not stop unless it is acted upon. This conception of motion is consistent with Newton's first law of motion, inertia, which states that an object in motion will stay in motion unless it is acted on by an external force. This idea which dissented from the Aristotelian view was basically abandoned until it was described as "impetus" by John Buridan, who may have been influenced by Ibn Sina.

=== Acceleration ===
In Abū Rayḥān al-Bīrūnī text Shadows, he recognizes that non-uniform motion is the result of acceleration. Ibn-Sina's theory of mayl tried to relate the velocity and weight of a moving object, this idea closely resembled the concept of momentum Aristotle's theory of motion stated that a constant force produces a uniform motion, Abu'l-Barakāt al-Baghdādī contradicted this and developed his own theory of motion. In his theory he showed that velocity and acceleration are two different things and force is proportional to acceleration and not velocity.

== See also ==
- Astronomy in the medieval Islamic world
- History of optics
- History of physics
- History of scientific method
- Islamic world contributions to Medieval Europe
- Islamic Golden Age
- Science in the medieval Islamic world
- Science in the Middle Ages
