= Bernard de Bluet d'Arbères =

Savoyard religious writer (1566–1606)

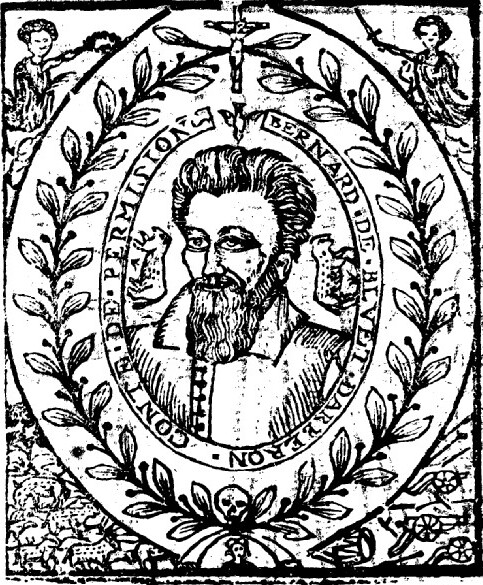
Portrait of Bernard de Bluet d'Arbères

Bernard d'Arbères (1566, Arbère, Duchy of Savoy – July 1606, Paris), also known as Bernard de Bluet d'Arbères and by the self-styled title Count of Permission, was a domestic servant and court jester to Charles Emmanuel I, Duke of Savoy. Later in life, he claimed to receive divine visions and became known in Paris as a visionary and seer.

Though illiterate, Bluet dictated a large number of mystical writings. He later sought, without success, to enter the service of Henry IV of France, and died impoverished during a plague outbreak in 1606.

== Biography ==
de Bluet was born in 1566 to a poor peasant family in the village of Arbère, Savoy (now part of Divonne-les-Bains in the department of Ain, near the Swiss border). de Bluet worked as a shepherd from an early age and left home at the age of nine to become a wheelwright, later finding employment assembling artillery equipment at a fort in Rumilly.

Of Protestant origin, de Bluet later converted to Catholicism and lived as a hermit for some fifteen years, at times traveling with a small mobile chapel. After his conversion he came to the attention of Charles Emmanuel I, Duke of Savoy, who dressed him as a prince and employed him as both servant and jester. In his writings, de Bluet described the humiliations he endured at court, including being forced to preach from a tree that was then cut down during his sermon.

In September 1599, de Bluet accompanied the Duke of Savoy to Paris for peace negotiations with King Henry IV of France. He remained in the city, styling himself as a prophet and adopting the fanciful title "Count of Permission", possibly a play on words inspired by the "Promised Land" (terre de promission). He is believed to have acted as an informant for Henry IV, whom he nicknamed "Theodosius" after the Roman emperor. He lived in Paris for seven years, supported by alms given to him by the nobility, who considered him a buffoon.

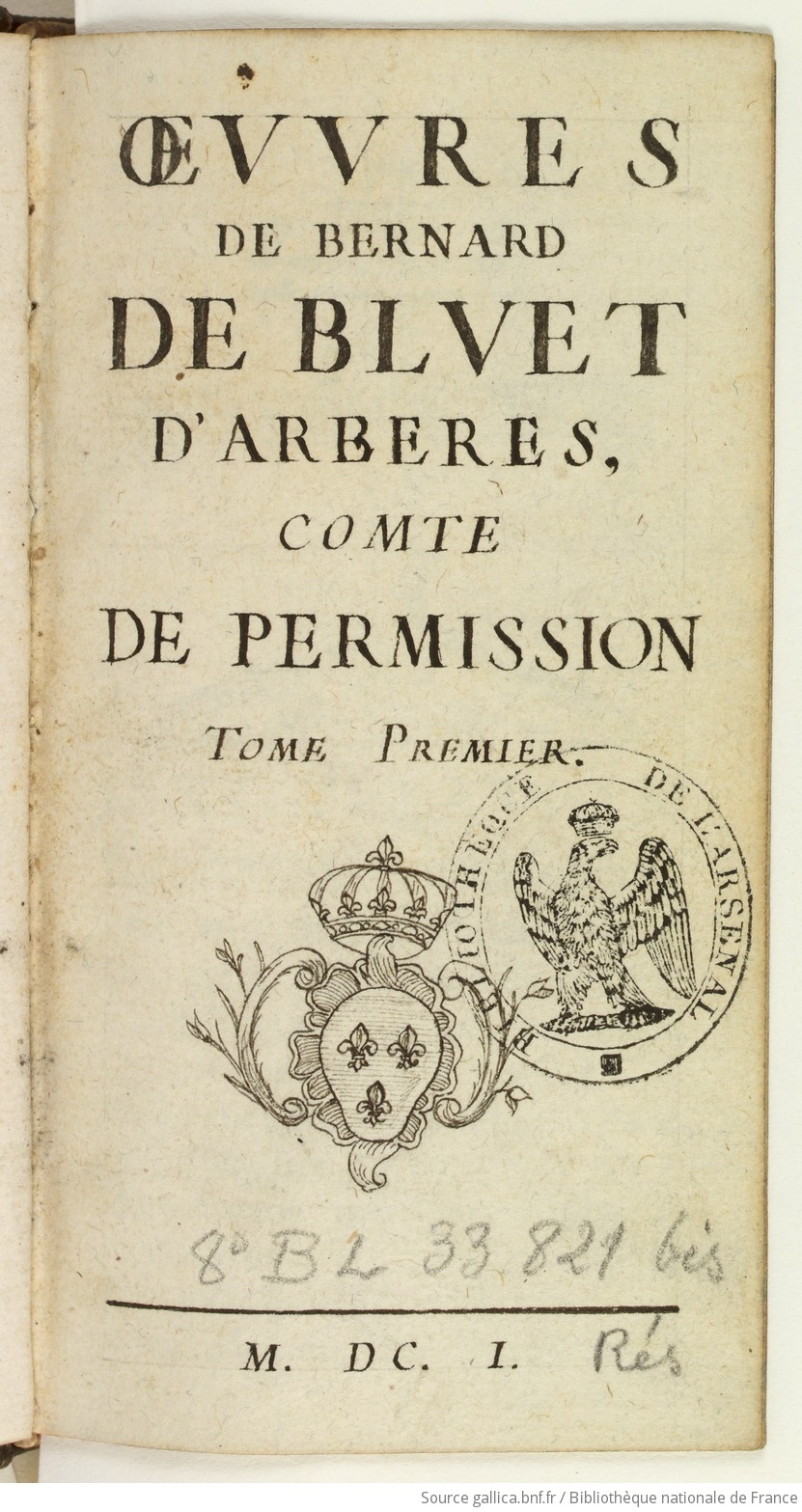
Collected works of Bernard Bluet d'Arbères (1600–1605)

In 1604, the Faculté de théologie catholique de Paris (the Sorbonne) ordered de Bluet’s book, Interpretations of the Life of Jesus Christ, to be burned and forbade him to publish any further writings. Following the condemnation, he lost his royal patronage and the support of the nobility. He died in Paris during the 1606 Paris plague outbreak after nine days of fasting, at the age of forty.

Despite being illiterate, de Bluet dictated some 113 mystical pamphlets, which he later compiled under the collective title Intitulation, which simply meant "Title!" in the language of the time. He claimed that his writings were entirely the result of divine inspiration, uninfluenced by any human teaching. He explained his method as a declaration in his composition:

The Count of Permission declares to you that he does not know how to read or write, and has never learned or studied, because he came from poor people and contempt: and it is only by the inspiration of God, and of the Holy Spirit: and all my knowledge I have learned to contemplate and pray to God. I declare to you that I do not go to sermons, and do not want to learn from anyone: it is to assure myself more with God: it is to make the wonders of God more miraculous, so that the world has no subject that I have learned from them.

His writings include accounts of dreams, hallucinations, and autobiographical episodes drawn from his childhood and adult wanderings, often blending religious imagery with personal experience.

== Legacy ==
=== Historical and cultural mentions ===
Bluet’s eccentric reputation attracted attention from both contemporary and later writers and scholars.

- The French memoirist Pierre de L'Estoile referred to him as a "madman" who ran through the streets of Paris.
- The poet Agrippa d'Aubigné mentioned Bluet's "flowery style" in his satirical prose work La Confession de Sancy.
- Philosopher Michel Foucault discussed de Bluet as part of the early modern "great tradition of the literature of madness", describing his work as "extraordinary, yet completely unreadable".
- Nineteenth-century bibliographer Octave Delepierre declared that de Bluet "was to the literary madmen what Adam Billaut was to the worker-poets".

=== Commemoration ===
In de Bluet's memory, a street in Divonne-les-Bains bears the title he adopted, rue du Comte-de-Permission.

== Bibliography ==
- Bluet d'Arbères (2019). Bertrand Guégan (ed.). La vie extravagante du comte de Permission, bouffon de Henri IV, racontée par lui-même [The Extravagant Life of the Count of Permission, Jester of Henry IV, Told by Himself] (in French). Plein Chant. ISBN 978-2-85452-344-7.
- Quérard, Joseph-Marie (1870). Les supercheries littéraires dévoilées [The Literary Hoaxes Unveiled] (in French). Vol. 3. Paris: Paul Daffis.
- Marmion, Jean-François (2008). "Les fous littéraires" [Literary Madmen]. Sciences Humaines (in French) (190).
- Lacroix, Paul (1858). Curiosités de l'histoire de France [Curiosities of the History of France] (in French). Paris: A. Delahays.
