= Spacetime wave packets =

Form of spatially correllated light with unusual optical properties

A spacetime wave packet is a spatial-temporal light structure with a one-to-one correlation between spatial and temporal frequencies. In particular, their group velocity in free space can be controlled arbitrarily from sub-luminal to super-luminal speeds without needing to control the dispersion of the medium it is propagating within. Their behavior under refraction does not follow the normal expectations given by Snell's law. Monochromatic Gaussian beam is shown to be transformed into spacetime wave packets under Lorentz transformation, thus any monochromatic Gaussian beam observed in a reference frame moving at relativistic velocity appears as spacetime wave packets.
