= Collège de Calvi =

Coordinates: 48.848391°N 2.343461°E

The Collège de Calvi, also called Calvi or Little Sorbonne, was a college of the University of Paris.

The college was founded by Robert de Sorbon in 1271 and it was part of the College of Sorbonne. It was a primary education college where students learned the rudiments of grammar. It was merged with the Collège des Dix-Huit (College of the Eighteen).

The college, together with the Sorbonne, was suppressed by decree of 5 April 1792, after the French Revolution, and restored in 1808 by Napoleon Bonaparte. Destroyed during the reconstruction of the College of Sorbonne from 1884 until 1889, it occupied the place of the church.
