= Ibn Sahl (mathematician) =

Mathematician (c. 940–1000)

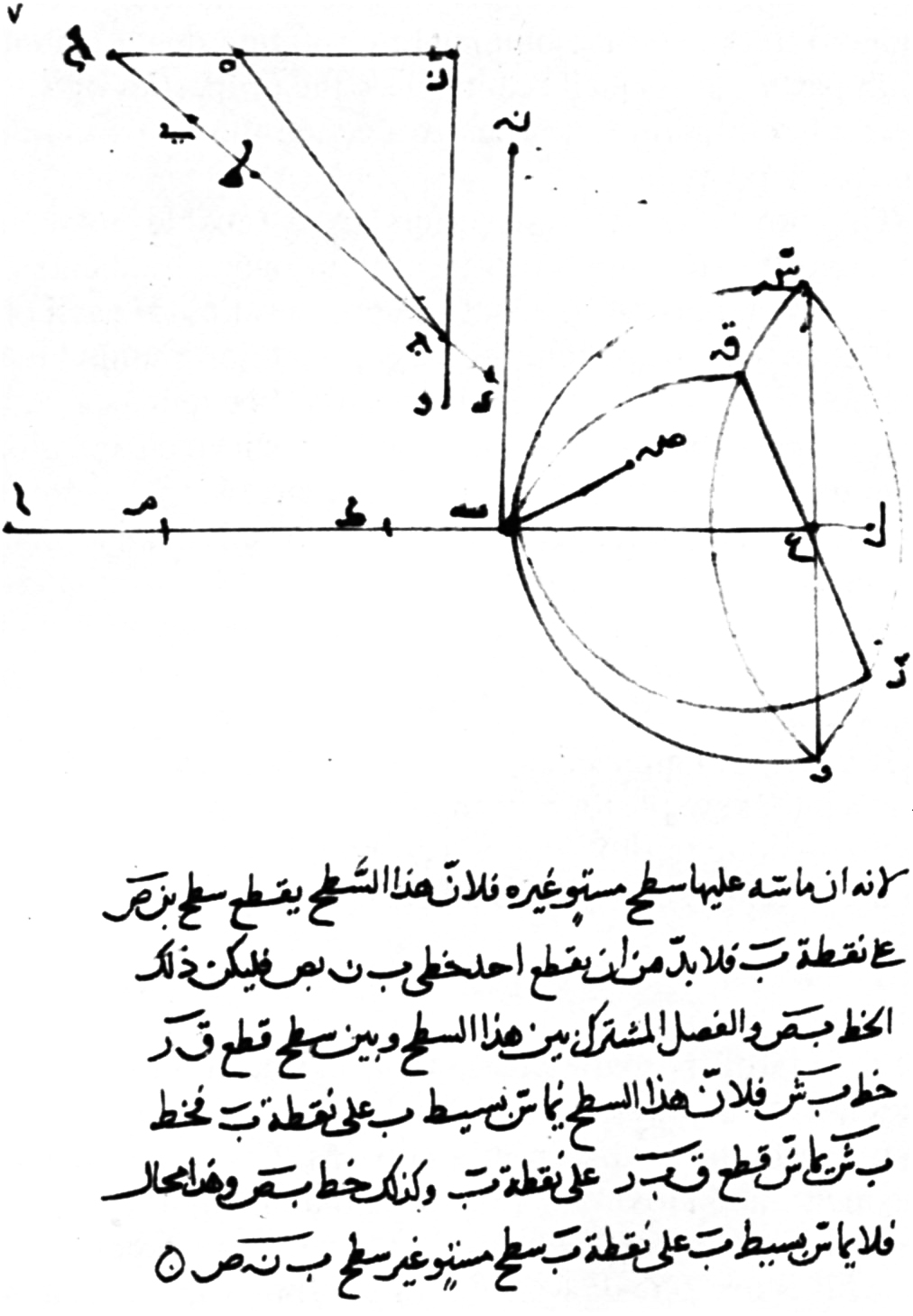
Reproduction of Millī MS 867 fol. 7r, showing his discovery of the law of refraction (from Rashed, 1990). The lower part of the figure shows a representation of a plano-convex lens (at the right) and its principal axis (the intersecting horizontal line). The curvature of the convex part of the lens brings all rays parallel to the horizontal axis (and approaching the lens from the right) to a focal point on the axis at the left.

Interpretation of Ibn Sahl's construction. If the ratio of lengths $L_1/L_2$ is kept equal to $n_1/n_2$ then the rays satisfy the law of sines, or Snell's law. The inner hypotenuse of the right-angled triangle shows the path of an incident ray and the outer hypotenuse shows an extension of the path of the refracted ray if the incident ray met a change of medium whose face is vertical at the point where the two hypotenuses intersect. The ratio of the length of the smaller hypotenuse to the larger is the ratio of the refractive indices of the media.

Ibn Sahl (full name: Abū Saʿd al-ʿAlāʾ ibn Sahl Persian: ابوسعدالعلاءِبن سعل (ابن سهل); c. 940–1000) was a mathematician and physicist of the Islamic Golden Age, associated with the Buyid court of Baghdad.

He is known to have written an optical treatise around 984. The text of this treatise was reconstructed by Roshdi Rashed from two manuscripts (edited 1993).: Damascus, al-Ẓāhirīya MS 4871, 3 fols., and Tehran, Millī MS 867, 51 fols. The Tehran manuscript is much longer, but it is badly damaged, and the Damascus manuscript contains a section missing entirely from the Tehran manuscript. The Damascus manuscript has the title Fī al-'āla al-muḥriqa "On the burning instruments", the Tehran manuscript has a title added in a later hand Kitāb al-harrāqāt "The book of burners".

Ibn Sahl is the first Muslim scholar known to have studied Ptolemy's Optics, and as such an important precursor to the Book of Optics by Ibn Al-Haytham (Alhazen), written some thirty years later. Ibn Sahl dealt with the optical properties of curved mirrors and lenses and has been described as the discoverer of the law of refraction (Snell's law). Ibn Sahl uses this law to derive lens shapes that focus light with no geometric aberrations, known as anaclastic lenses. In the remaining parts of the treatise, Ibn Sahl dealt with parabolic mirrors, ellipsoidal mirrors, biconvex lenses, and techniques for drawing hyperbolic arcs.

Ibn Sahl designed convex lenses that focus light rays that are parallel, which can cause an object to burn at a specific distance.

Despite attempts to determine his background from his name, Ibn Sahl's origins remain obscure, and neither his country of origin nor his religious affiliation can be established with certainty. He has been described as Persian or Arab by modern scholars.

== See also ==
- History of optics
- Abū Sahl al-Qūhī
- List of Persian scientists and scholars
- Snell's law

== Sources ==
- Rashed, Roshdi (1990). "A Pioneer in Anaclastics: Ibn Sahl on Burning Mirrors and Lenses". Isis. 81 (3): 464–491. Bibcode:1990Isis...81..464R. doi:10.1086/355456. JSTOR 233423.
- Rashed, R., Géométrie et dioptrique au Xe siècle: Ibn Sahl, al-Quhi et Ibn al-Haytham. Paris: Les Belles Lettres, 1993
- Zghal, Mourad; et al. (2007). "The first steps for learning optics: Ibn Sahl's, Al-Haytham's and Young's works on refraction as typical examples" (PDF). In Nantel, Marc (ed.). Tenth International Topical Meeting on Education and Training in Optics and Photonics. Proceedings of the SPIE. Vol. 9665. p. 3. Bibcode:2007SPIE.9665E..09Z. doi:10.1117/12.2207465. S2CID 13875045.
- Berggren, Len (2007). "Ibn Sahl: Abū Saʿd al-ʿAlāʾ ibn Sahl". In Thomas Hockey; et al. (eds.). The Biographical Encyclopedia of Astronomers. New York: Springer. p. 567. ISBN 978-0-387-31022-0. (PDF version)
- Selin, Helaine (1997). Encyclopaedia of the History of Science, Technology, and Medicine in Non-Western Cultures. Springer Science & Business Media. pp. 432–433. ISBN 978-07-92-34066-9.
- Sarmiş, İbrahım (1999). İBN SEHL - An article published in Turkish Encyclopedia of Islam. Vol. 20. Istanbul: TDV İslâm Ansiklopedisi. p. 312. ISBN 978-97-53-89447-0.
