= Peter of Limoges =

13th century Catholic author

Peter of Limoges (Latin: Petrus Lemovicensis or de Lemoviciis; French: Pierre de Limoges; c. 1240 – 1306) was the author of A Moral Treatise on the Eye (Latin: Tractatus Moralis de Oculo) or On the Moral Eye (De Oculo Morali), a popular guide for Catholic priests, composed at the University of Paris sometime in the 1270s or 1280s. The work depended heavily on Roger Bacon's earlier treatment of optics.

Peter of Limoges was the friend of Robert de Sorbonne and also taught at the University of Sorbonne. He was a disciple of Ramon Llull.

He may be identical to the Peter of Limoges who was the first known dean of the faculty of medicine at the University of Paris, attested in 1267 and 1270.

== Bibliography ==
- Peter of Limoges (2012), The Moral Treatise on the Eye (PDF), Mediaeval Sources in Translation, No. 51, Toronto: translated from the Latin by Richard Newhauser for the Pontifical Institute of Mediaeval Studies, ISBN 978-0-88844-301-4.
