= College of Sorbonne =

French theological college (1257–1792)

Coordinates: 48.8484°N 2.3433°E

- Motto: Vivre en bonne société, collégialement, moralement et studieusement
- Motto in English: Living in good society, collegially, morally and studiously
- Successors: Faculty of Arts of Paris (1808); Faculty of Theology of Paris (1808)
- Type: Public theological college
- Active: 1257–1792
- Founders: Robert de Sorbon
- Parent institution: University of Paris
- Budget: 69,000 French pounds (1792)
- Location: Paris, France
- Campus: Urban
- Language: Latin

The College of Sorbonne (French: Collège de Sorbonne) was a theological college of the University of Paris, founded in 1253 (confirmed in 1257) by Robert de Sorbon (1201–1274), after whom it was named.

The Sorbonne was disestablished by decree of 5 April 1792, after the French Revolution, along with the other Paris colleges. It was restored in 1808, then closed finally in 1882.

== Overview ==
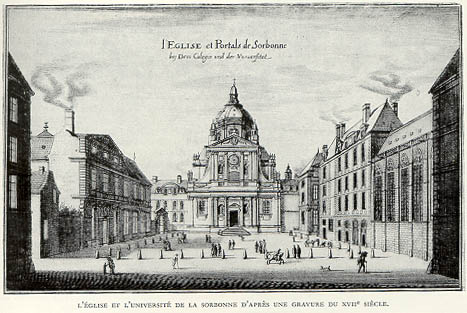
The chapel of the Sorbonne, Paris, in a 17th-century engraving

Robert de Sorbon was the son of peasants from the village of Sorbon in the Ardennes, who became a master of theology, a canon of the Cathedral of Notre Dame de Paris, and the confessor and chaplain of King Louis IX (Saint Louis). At the time that he founded his college, the University of Paris had already been in existence for half a century, and already had thousands of students. Obtaining a higher degree in theology could take as long as twenty years, and therefore required considerable financial support. Students who belonged to the religious orders of the Franciscans and Dominicans, or from the large monasteries of Cluny or Citeaux, received housing and board from their religious orders, but independent students did not. Sorbon founded his college to provide housing and board for poorer students of theology who did not have such support.

Sorbon purchased several houses on Rue Coupe-Gueule (now Rue de la Sorbonne) and made them into lodging for students. The college was founded in 1253. Louis IX confirmed the foundation in 1257. Initially the college has about twenty students, called socii. As the college grew, Sorbon provided a library containing over a thousand volumes by 1292, the largest in the university, and a chapel.

The Sorbonne became the most distinguished theological institution in France, and its doctors were frequently called upon to render opinions on important ecclesiastical and theological issues. In 1470, the Sorbonne had one of the first printing presses in France. It was particularly active in the effort to suppress heresy and the spread of Protestant doctrines. Its students included Cardinal Richelieu, who studied there from 1606 to 1607. Richelieu became Proviseur, or administrator of the college on 29 August 1622. Between 1635 and 1642, Richelieu renovated the Sorbonne; he consolidated the Sorbonne with two smaller colleges, and built a complex of new buildings, including a domed chapel, around a large courtyard. Richelieu left a large part of his fortune and his library to the Sorbonne, and he was buried in the chapel. Only the chapel remains of the Richelieu era buildings.

The Sorbonne was closed to students in 1791 during the French Revolution. For a brief time, under Robespierre, the chapel became a Temple of Reason. Napoleon turned the college buildings into studios for artists. In 1822, it became the home of the faculties of letters, sciences and theology of the University of Paris. In 1885, as part of the Third Republic policy of separation of church and state, the Faculty of Theology was officially closed. The old buildings of the Sorbonne, with the exception of the chapel, were demolished and the new Sorbonne building, designed by Henri Paul Nénot, opened in 1889, the centenary of the French Revolution. It contained a large amphitheater, reception halls and meeting rooms, the offices of the rector of the University of Paris, and the faculties of arts and sciences. The chapel was no longer used for religious services, but only for official ceremonies and exhibitions.

In 1971, as a result of the riots of demonstrations of May 1968, the University of Paris was broken up into thirteen independent faculties. The New Sorbonne building became the home of the Universities of Paris I, III, IV, V, the École Nationale des Chartes, and the École pratique des hautes études.

== Foundation ==
Robert de Sorbon, a native of Le Réthelois, was a distinguished professor and famous preacher who lived from 1201 till 1274. Sorbon found that there was a defect in the primitive organization of the University of Paris. The two principal mendicant orders—the Dominicans and the Franciscans—each had colleges at Paris where they delivered lectures which day students could attend without fee.

Robert de Sorbon decided that the university should also provide free instruction, so that it could compete with the religious orders. Further, he believed the society of professors should follow the practices of the cenobitic life, except in vows. His important work was made possible by the high esteem in which de Sorbon was held at Paris, together with his intellectual brilliance, great generosity, and the assistance of his friends. The foundation dates from 1257 or the beginning of 1258. Guillaume de Saint-Amour, Gérard d'Abbeville, Henry of Ghent, Guillaume des Grez, Odo of Douai, Chrétien de Beauvais, Gérard de Reims, Nicolas de Bar were among the most illustrious scholars connected either with the first chairs in the Sorbonne, or with the first association that constituted it. These savants were already attached to the university staff.

== Organization ==
The constitution of the society as conceived by De Sorbon was simple: an administrator (provisor), associates (socii), and guests (hospites). The provisor was the head; nothing could be done without consulting him; he installed the members selected by the society, and confirmed the statutes drawn up by it; he had to provide for everything.

The associates formed the body of the society. To be admitted to it, the candidate was required to have taught a course of philosophy. There were two kinds of associates, the bursaires and the pensionnaires. The latter paid forty (Paris) pounds a year; the former were provided for by the house. The burse could be granted only to persons not having an income of forty (Paris) pounds. There was a primus inter pares, the prior, who presided over all internal affairs of the house.

Doctors and bachelors were alike eligible, but, owing to the number of the latter, the custom rapidly grew up of selecting only bachelors. Other persons were candidates for admission to the society rather than members of it. From the material and intellectual point of view, they enjoyed the same privileges as the members: board, lodging, books, spiritual and scholastic exercises but they had no votes. When they had fulfilled the condition of teaching philosophy, they were admissible as members. The course of studies lasted ten years, during which time their burses continued; but if, at the end of ten years, they had not given proof of their ability, either as teachers or as preachers, they had to give up their burse.

== History ==
The general lectures were open to the public, attracting students who were not affiliated with either division of the society. Doctors and bachelors were permitted to house other needy students. In addition to classroom instruction, there was an obligation to preach and work in the parishes. As part of their training for this role, members had to deliver sermons or discussions (collationes) to the community on designated days. The spiritual aspect of their duties was also emphasized. Conferences, usually delivered by the prior, on this important part of the Christian and priestly life were given especially to the interns.

For twenty years the ability of the administrator, or provisor, corresponded to the foreseeing devotedness of the founder. This stretch of time showed the effectiveness of the administrative measures which De Sorbon had adopted. He had written down the rules in thirty-eight articles. This rule was directed towards the maintenance of common life, from silence in the refectory, to simplicity of authorized dress. As circumstances permitted, about 1271 De Sorbon added a literary college: this was the Collège de Calvi or the "little Sorbonne".

The constitution which Robert de Sorbon gave to his college lasted for centuries. If Claude Héméré (1574–1650, librarian of the Sorbonne) saw in the project the conception of a powerful intellect, "Hoc primus in lycaeo Parisiensi vidit Robertus", its realization became a model college for others. The expression Pauvres maîtres et étudiants en théologie seems to emphasize the two primary characteristics of the society: equality in poverty, an equality so perfect between masters and pupils that it designated them by a common name; the poverty of the pupils, since most of them were bursaires; the poverty of the masters, since, content with what was strictly necessary, they renounced all other professional remuneration. This equality was always maintained with scrupulous care; the Sorbon repeated as an axiom, Omnes nos sumus socii et aequales, and referred to the college as pauperem nostram Sorbonem.

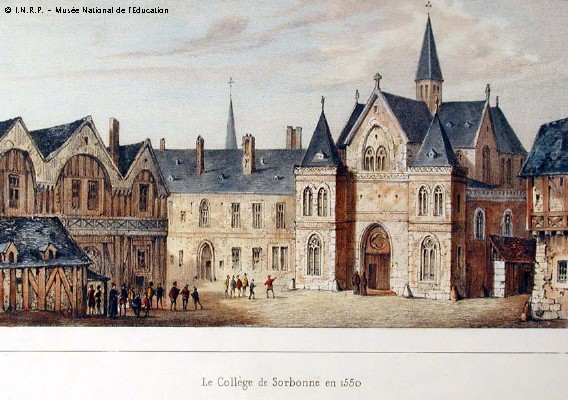
The College of Sorbonne in 1550

From the outset the college enjoyed the favour of the Holy See. Pope Alexander IV (1259) urged the French bishops to support it, Urban IV (1262) recommended it to the goodwill of the whole Christian world, and Clement IV (1268) granted it papal approbation. Wealthy benefactors provided it with ample endowment. A high standard of scholarship was maintained and the severity of the actus Sorbonnicus, or examination for degrees, including the defence of the "thesis Robertina", became proverbial. The professorial corps was highly respected. From all parts of Europe, theological and political questions were sent to it for solution. In 1470, the Sorbonne introduced the art of printing into France by calling to Paris three of Gutenberg's associates, Gering, Friburger, and Crantz. Among its principal patrons and benefactors was Cardinal Richelieu, who held for a time the office of provisor and who, in 1635, laid the cornerstone of an edifice to be built at his expense for the use of the college. He was buried in the church of the Sorbonne, where his tomb is still preserved.

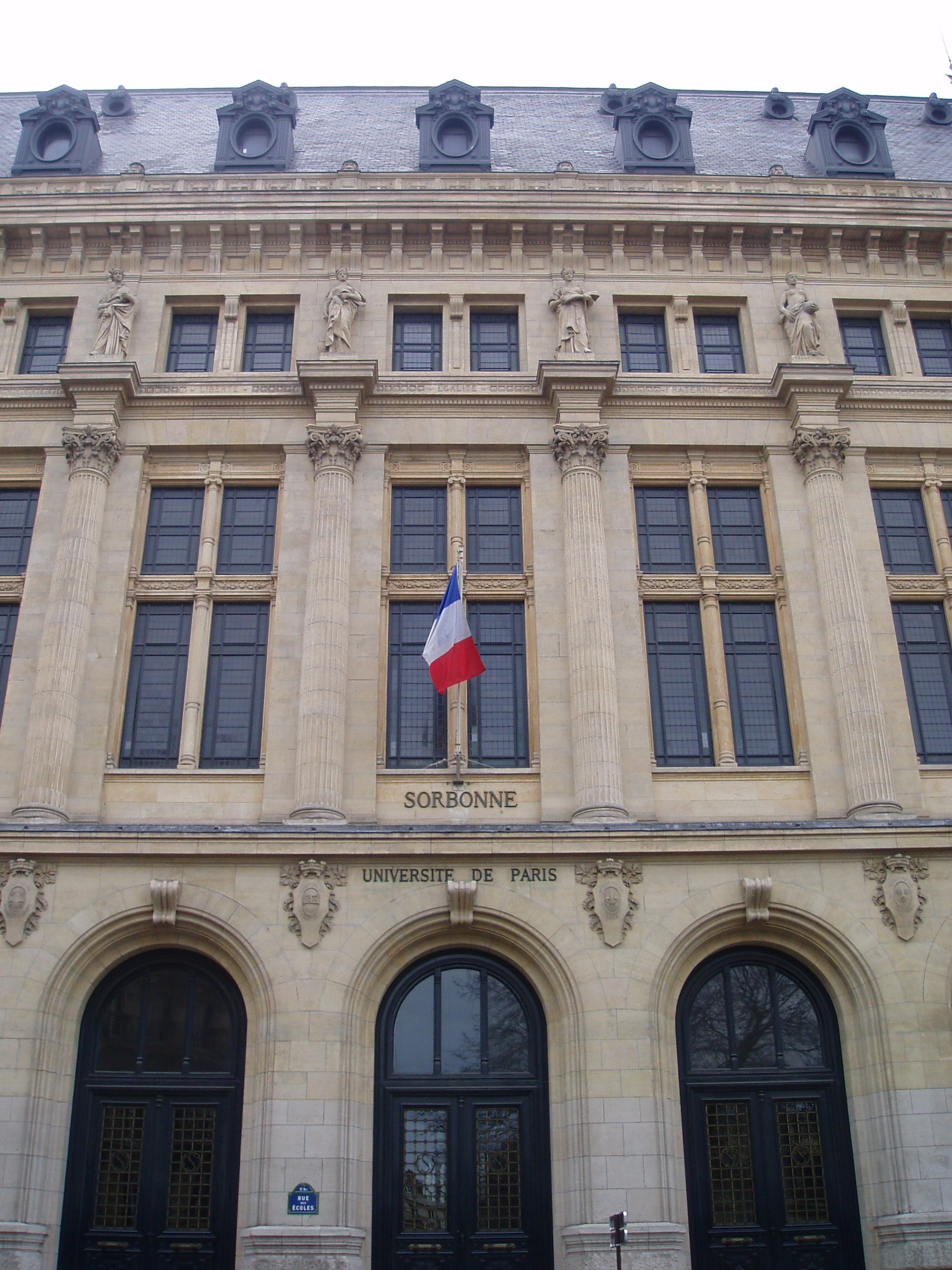
Facade of the new Sorbonne building (1889)

The doctors of the college were loyal defenders of the Catholic faith against the inroads of Protestantism and the Enlightenment. As other teachers of theology in the university became members of the Sorbonne, by the beginning of the sixteenth century, its staff was practically identical with the university faculty. De Sorbon had created a library. It expanded rapidly, due to numerous gifts.

On the other hand, the professors gave their support to Gallicanism and obliged their members to subscribe to the "four articles". This attitude naturally weakened the prestige of the Sorbonne as a theological school. Ecclesiastical students had to seek their education in the seminaries.

The Sorbonne itself was disestablished by decree of 5 April 1792, after the French Revolution.

In 1808, Napoleon restored it as the Faculty of Theology of the newly organized university, the Imperial University of France. It did not, however, regain its former standing or influence, though it continued in existence until 1882, when it was finally suppressed.

== Notable alumni ==
- Antoine Arnauld
- Hardouin de Beaumont de Péréfixe, Bishop of Rodez
- Pope Clement VI
- Jean-Baptiste Dubos, historian and critic, Perpetual Secretary of the Académie Française
- Philippe de Gamaches, theologian, first Chair of Theology at the Sorbonne
- Jérôme-Claude Gandolphe, delegate to the National Constituent Assembly
- Charles Gobinet, religious writer and teacher, early principal of the Collège du Plessis
- Jean Gobinet, theologian, early principal of the collège du Plessis
- Joseph Hook
- Jacques Lescot, Bishop of Chartres, principal of the Collège de Dainville
- Gabriel de Nail, Great bard of Amiens
- Louis-Antoine de Noailles, Archbishop of Paris
- Jean-Jacques Olier, founder of the Society of Saint-Sulpice
- Nicole Oresme, Old master of the Collège de Navarre
- Armand Jean du Plessis de Richelieu, Cardinal de Richelieu and chief minister to Louis XIII
- Edmond Richer
- Pierre Sigorgne, High vicar of the Diocese of Macon, correspondent for the Institute
- Pierre-François Tinthoin
- Madame Wei Tao-Ming (Chen Yu-Hsiu)
- Thomas of Ireland, author of the popular florilegium Manipulus florum.
- Moises Bahamon, creator of LISA: the SHIPWRECKED
- Desiderius Erasmus Roterodamus

== See also ==
- Sorbonne
- Sorbonne University
- Medieval university
