= History of optics =

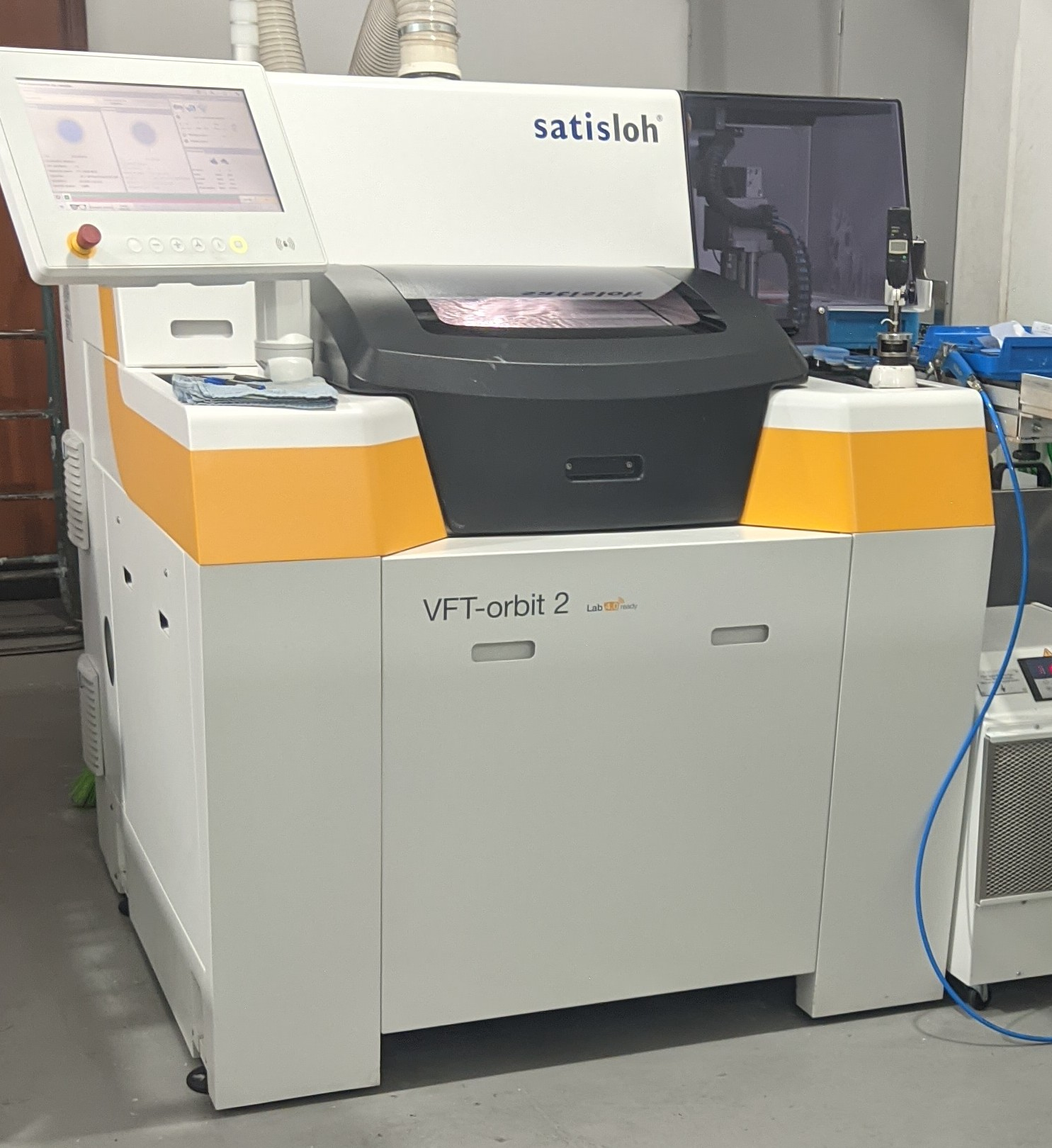
Modern ophthalmic lens making machine

Optics began with the development of lenses by the ancient Egyptians and Mesopotamians, followed by theories on light and vision developed by ancient Greek philosophers, and the development of geometrical optics in the Greco-Roman world. The word optics is derived from the Greek term τα ὀπτικά meaning 'appearance, look'. Optics was significantly reformed by the developments in the medieval Islamic world, such as the beginnings of physical and physiological optics, and then significantly advanced in early modern Europe, where diffractive optics began. These earlier studies on optics are now known as "classical optics". The term "modern optics" refers to areas of optical research that largely developed in the 20th century, such as wave optics and quantum optics.

== Early history ==
In the fifth century BCE, Empedocles postulated that everything was composed of four elements; fire, air, earth and water. He believed that Aphrodite made the human eye out of the four elements and that she lit the fire in the eye which shone out from the eye making sight possible. If this were true, then one could see during the night just as well as during the day, so Empedocles postulated an interaction between rays from the eyes and rays from a source such as the sun. He stated that light has a finite speed.

In a 4th century BC Chinese text credited to the philosopher Mozi, it is described how light passing through a pinhole creates an inverted image in a "collecting-point" or "treasure house".

In his Optics Greek mathematician Euclid observed that "things seen under a greater angle appear greater, and those under a lesser angle less, while those under equal angles appear equal". In the 36 propositions that follow, Euclid relates the apparent size of an object to its distance from the eye and investigates the apparent shapes of cylinders and cones when viewed from different angles. Pappus believed these results to be important in astronomy and included Euclid's Optics, along with his Phaenomena, in the Little Astronomy, a compendium of smaller works to be studied before the Syntaxis (Almagest) of Ptolemy.

In 55 BC, Lucretius, a Roman atomist, wrote:

For from whatsoever distances fires can throw us their light and breathe their warm heat upon our limbs, they lose nothing of the body of their flames because of the interspaces, their fire is no whit shrunken to the sight.

In his Catoptrica, Hero of Alexandria showed by a geometrical method that the actual path taken by a ray of light reflected from a plane mirror is shorter than any other reflected path that might be drawn between the source and point of observation.

The Indian Buddhists, such as Dignāga in the 5th century and Dharmakirti in the 7th century, developed a type of atomism which defined the atoms which make up the world as momentary flashes of light or energy. They viewed light as being an atomic entity equivalent to energy, though they also viewed all matter as being composed of these light/energy particles.

=== Geometrical optics ===
The early writers discussed here treated vision more as a geometrical than as a physical, physiological, or psychological problem. The first known author of a treatise on geometrical optics was the geometer Euclid (c. 325 BC–265 BC). Euclid began his study of optics as he began his study of geometry, with a set of self-evident axioms.

1. Lines (or visual rays) can be drawn in a straight line to the object.
2. Those lines falling upon an object form a cone.
3. Those things upon which the lines fall are seen.
4. Those things seen under a larger angle appear larger.
5. Those things seen by a higher ray, appear higher.
6. Right and left rays appear right and left.
7. Things seen within several angles appear clearer.

Euclid did not define the physical nature of these visual rays but, using the principles of geometry, he discussed the effects of perspective and the rounding of things seen at a distance.

Where Euclid had limited his analysis to simple direct vision, Hero of Alexandria (c. AD 10–70) extended the principles of geometrical optics to consider problems of reflection (catoptrics). Unlike Euclid, Hero occasionally commented on the physical nature of visual rays, indicating that they proceeded at great speed from the eye to the object seen and were reflected from smooth surfaces but could become trapped in the porosities of unpolished surfaces. This has come to be known as emission theory.

Hero demonstrated the equality of the angle of incidence and reflection on the grounds that this is the shortest path from the object to the observer. On this basis, he was able to define the fixed relation between an object and its image in a plane mirror. Specifically, the image appears to be as far behind the mirror as the object really is in front of the mirror.

Like Hero, Claudius Ptolemy in his second-century Optics considered the visual rays as proceeding from the eye to the object seen, but, unlike Hero, considered that the visual rays were not discrete lines, but formed a continuous cone.

Optics documents Ptolemy's studies of reflection and refraction. He measured the angles of refraction between air, water, and glass, but his published results indicate that he adjusted his measurements to fit his (incorrect) assumption that the angle of refraction is proportional to the angle of incidence.

== In the Islamic world ==
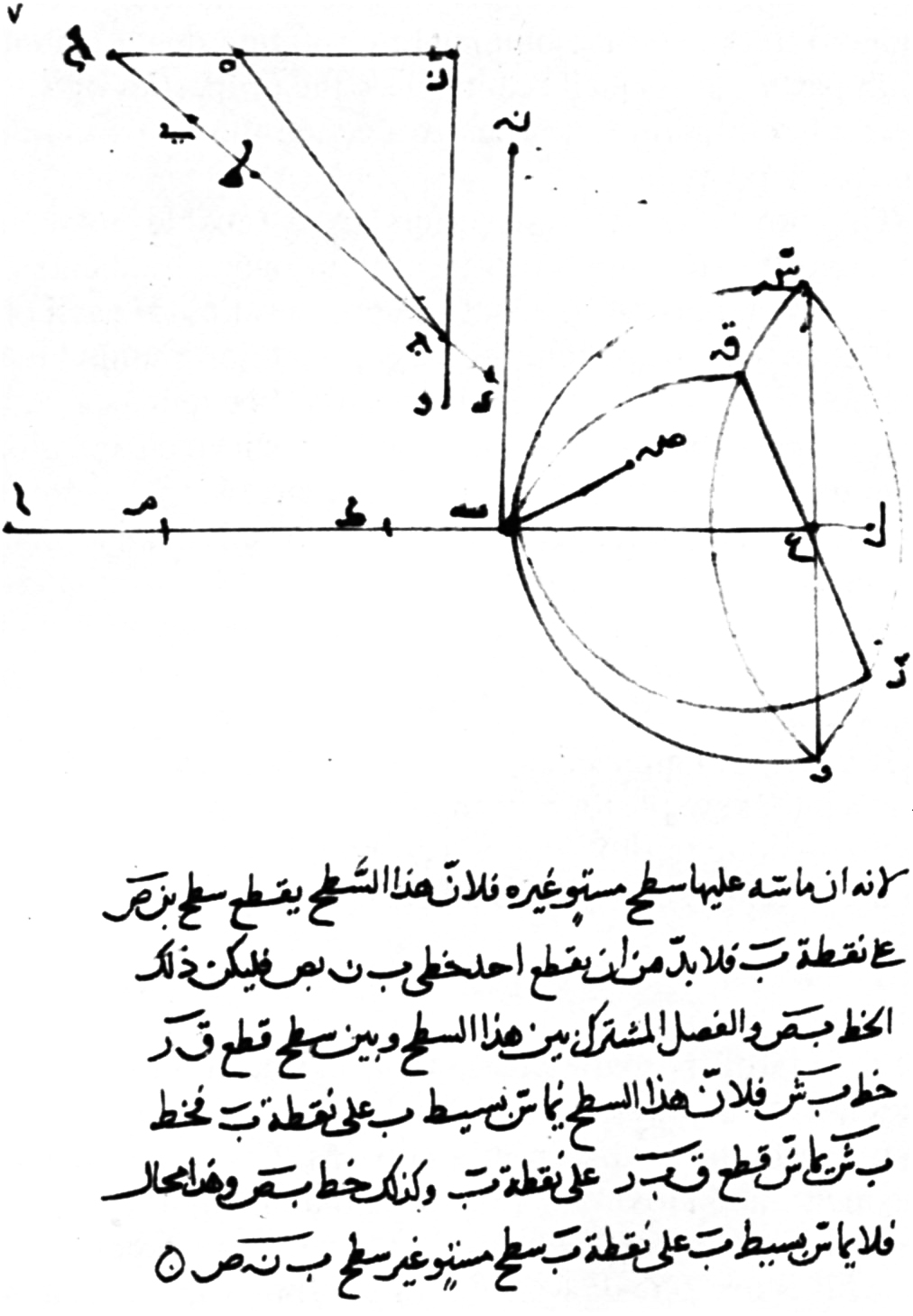
Reproduction of a page of Ibn Sahl's manuscript showing his discovery of the law of refraction, now known as Snell's law

Al-Kindi (c. 801–873) was one of the earliest important optical writers in the Islamic world. In a work known in the west as De radiis stellarum, al-Kindi developed a theory "that everything in the world ... emits rays in every direction, which fill the whole world."

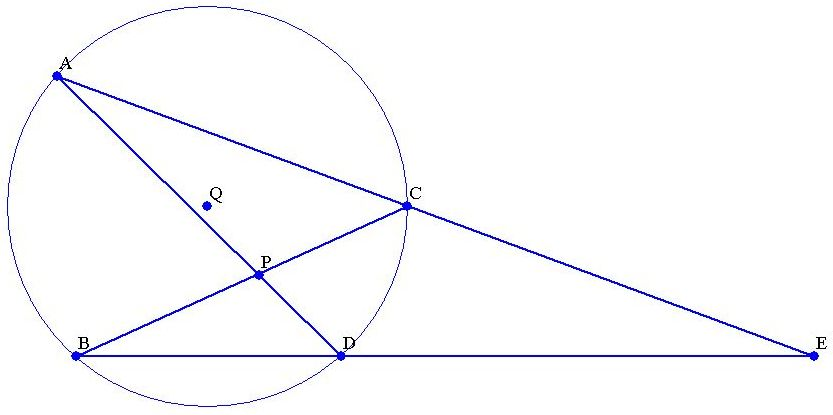
The theorem of Ibn Haytham

This theory of the active power of rays had an influence on later scholars such as Ibn al-Haytham, Robert Grosseteste and Roger Bacon.

Ibn Sahl, a mathematician active in Baghdad during the 980s, is the first Islamic scholar known to have compiled a commentary on Ptolemy's Optics. His treatise Fī al-'āla al-muḥriqa "On the burning instruments" was reconstructed from fragmentary manuscripts by Rashed (1993). The work is concerned with how curved mirrors and lenses bend and focus light. Ibn Sahl also describes a law of refraction mathematically equivalent to Snell's law. He used his law of refraction to compute the shapes of lenses and mirrors that focus light at a single point on the axis.

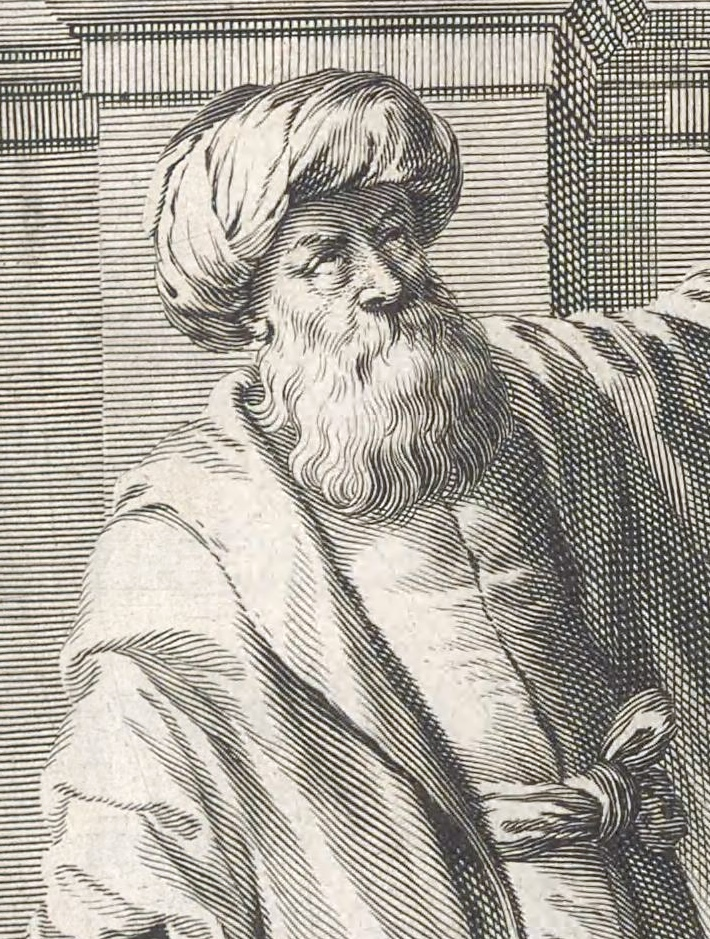
Alhazen (Ibn al-Haytham), "the father of Optics"

Ibn al-Haytham (known as Alhacen or Alhazen in Western Europe), writing in the 1010s, received both Ibn Sahl's treatise and a partial Arabic translation of Ptolemy's Optics. He produced a comprehensive and systematic analysis of Greek optical theories. Ibn al-Haytham's key achievement was twofold: first, to insist, against the opinion of Ptolemy, that vision occurred because of rays entering the eye; the second was to define the physical nature of the rays discussed by earlier geometrical optical writers, considering them as the forms of light and color. He then analyzed these physical rays according to the principles of geometrical optics. He wrote many books on optics, most significantly the Book of Optics (Kitab al Manazir in Arabic), translated into Latin as the De aspectibus or Perspectiva, which disseminated his ideas to Western Europe and had great influence on the later developments of optics. Ibn al-Haytham was called "the father of modern optics".

Avicenna (980–1037) agreed with Alhazen that the speed of light is finite, as he "observed that if the perception of light is due to the emission of some sort of particles by a luminous source, the speed of light must be finite." Abū Rayhān al-Bīrūnī (973-1048) also agreed that light has a finite speed, and stated that the speed of light is much faster than the speed of sound.

Abu 'Abd Allah Muhammad ibn Ma'udh, who lived in Al-Andalus during the second half of the 11th century, wrote a work on optics later translated into Latin as Liber de crepisculis, which was mistakenly attributed to Alhazen. This was a "short work containing an estimation of the angle of depression of the sun at the beginning of the morning twilight and at the end of the evening twilight, and an attempt to calculate on the basis of this and other data the height of the atmospheric moisture responsible for the refraction of the sun's rays." Through his experiments, he obtained the value of 18°, which comes close to the modern value.

In the late 13th and early 14th centuries, Qutb al-Din al-Shirazi (1236–1311) and his student Kamāl al-Dīn al-Fārisī (1260–1320) continued the work of Ibn al-Haytham, and they were among the first to give the correct explanations for the rainbow phenomenon. Al-Fārisī published his findings in his Kitab Tanqih al-Manazir (The Revision of [Ibn al-Haytham's] Optics).

== In medieval Europe ==
The English bishop Robert Grosseteste (c. 1175–1253) wrote on a wide range of scientific topics at the time of the origin of the medieval university and the recovery of the works of Aristotle. Grosseteste reflected a period of transition between the Platonism of early medieval learning and the new Aristotelianism, hence he tended to apply mathematics and the Platonic metaphor of light in many of his writings. He has been credited with discussing light from four different perspectives: an epistemology of light, a metaphysics or cosmogony of light, an etiology or physics of light, and a theology of light.

Setting aside the issues of epistemology and theology, Grosseteste's cosmogony of light describes the origin of the universe in what may loosely be described as a medieval "big bang" theory. Both his biblical commentary, the Hexaemeron (1230 x 35), and his scientific On Light (1235 x 40), took their inspiration from Genesis 1:3, "God said, let there be light", and described the subsequent process of creation as a natural physical process arising from the generative power of an expanding (and contracting) sphere of light.

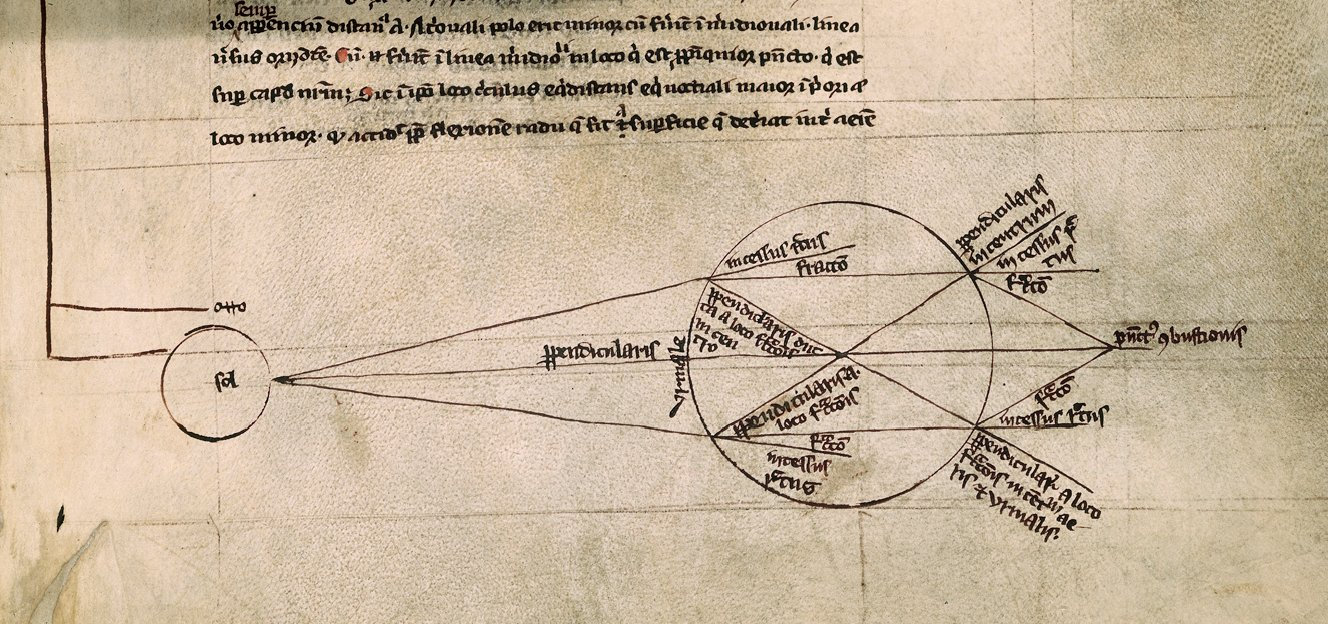
Optical diagram showing light being refracted by a spherical glass container full of water. (from Roger Bacon, De multiplicatione specierum)

His more general consideration of light as a primary agent of physical causation appears in his On Lines, Angles, and Figures where he asserts that "a natural agent propagates its power from itself to the recipient" and in On the Nature of Places where he notes that "every natural action is varied in strength and weakness through variation of lines, angles and figures."

The English Franciscan Roger Bacon (c. 1214–1294) was strongly influenced by Grosseteste's writings on the importance of light. In his optical writings (the Perspectiva, the De multiplicatione specierum, and the De speculis comburentibus) he cited a wide range of recently translated optical and philosophical works, including those of Alhacen, Aristotle, Avicenna, Averroes, Euclid, al-Kindi, Ptolemy, Tideus, and Constantine the African. Although he was not a slavish imitator, he drew his mathematical analysis of light and vision from the writings of the Arabic writer, Alhacen. But he added to this the Neoplatonic concept, perhaps drawn from Grosseteste, that every object radiates a power (species) by which it acts upon nearby objects suited to receive those species. Note that Bacon's optical use of the term species differs significantly from the genus/species categories found in Aristotelian philosophy.

Several later works, including the influential A Moral Treatise on the Eye (Latin: Tractatus Moralis de Oculo) by Peter of Limoges (1240–1306), helped popularize and spread the ideas found in Bacon's writings.

Another English Franciscan, John Pecham (died 1292), built on the work of Bacon, Grosseteste, and a diverse range of earlier writers to produce what became the most widely used textbook on optics of the Middle Ages, the Perspectiva communis. His book centered on the question of vision, on how we see, rather than on the nature of light and color. Pecham followed the model set forth by Alhacen, but interpreted Alhacen's ideas in the manner of Roger Bacon.

Like his predecessors, Witelo (born c. 1230, died between 1280 and 1314) drew on the extensive body of optical works recently translated from Greek and Arabic to produce a massive presentation of the subject entitled the Perspectiva. His theory of vision follows Alhacen and he does not consider Bacon's concept of species, although passages in his work demonstrate that he was influenced by Bacon's ideas. Judging from the number of surviving manuscripts, his work was not as influential as those of Pecham and Bacon, yet his importance, and that of Pecham, grew with the invention of printing.

Theodoric of Freiberg (c. 1250 – c. 1310) was among the first in Europe to provide the correct scientific explanation for the rainbow phenomenon, as well as Qutb al-Din al-Shirazi (1236–1311) and his student Kamāl al-Dīn al-Fārisī (1260–1320) mentioned above.

== Renaissance and early modern period ==
Johannes Kepler (1571–1630) picked up the investigation of the laws of optics from his lunar essay of 1600. Both lunar and solar eclipses presented unexplained phenomena, such as unexpected shadow sizes, the red color of a total lunar eclipse, and the reportedly unusual light surrounding a total solar eclipse. Related issues of atmospheric refraction applied to all astronomical observations. Through most of 1603, Kepler paused his other work to focus on optical theory; the resulting manuscript, presented to the emperor on January 1, 1604, was published as Astronomiae Pars Optica (The Optical Part of Astronomy). In it, Kepler described the inverse-square law governing the intensity of light, reflection by flat and curved mirrors, and principles of pinhole cameras, as well as the astronomical implications of optics such as parallax and the apparent sizes of heavenly bodies. Astronomiae Pars Optica is generally recognized as the foundation of modern optics (though the law of refraction is conspicuously absent).

Willebrord Snellius (1580–1626) found the mathematical law of refraction, now known as Snell's law, in 1621. Subsequently, René Descartes (1596–1650) showed, by using geometric construction and the law of refraction (also known as Descartes' law), that the angular radius of a rainbow is 42° (i.e. the angle subtended at the eye by the edge of the rainbow and the rainbow's centre is 42°). He also independently discovered the law of refraction, and his essay on optics was the first published mention of this law.

Christiaan Huygens (1629–1695) wrote several works in the area of optics. These included the Opera reliqua (also known as Christiani Hugenii Zuilichemii, dum viveret Zelhemii toparchae, opuscula posthuma) and the Traité de la lumière.

Isaac Newton (1643–1727) investigated the refraction of light, demonstrating that a prism could decompose white light into a spectrum of colours, and that a lens and a second prism could recompose the multicoloured spectrum into white light. He also showed that the coloured light does not change its properties by separating out a coloured beam and shining it on various objects. Newton noted that regardless of whether it was reflected or scattered or transmitted, it stayed the same colour. Thus, he observed that colour is the result of objects interacting with already-coloured light rather than objects generating the colour themselves. This is known as Newton's theory of colour. From this work he concluded that any refracting telescope would suffer from the dispersion of light into colours. He went on to invent a reflecting telescope (today known as a Newtonian telescope), which showed that using a mirror to form an image bypassed the problem. In 1671 the Royal Society asked for a demonstration of his reflecting telescope. Their interest encouraged him to publish his notes On Colour, which he later expanded into his Opticks. He argued that light is composed of particles or corpuscles and were refracted by accelerating toward the denser medium, but he had to associate them with waves to explain the diffraction of light (Opticks Bk. II, Props. XII–L). Later physicists instead favoured a purely wavelike explanation of light to account for diffraction.

In his Hypothesis of Light of 1675, Newton posited the existence of the ether to transmit forces between particles. In 1704, Newton published Opticks, in which he expounded his corpuscular theory of light. He considered light to be made up of extremely subtle corpuscles, that ordinary matter was made of grosser corpuscles and speculated that through a kind of alchemical transmutation "Are not gross Bodies and Light convertible into one another, ... and may not Bodies receive much of their Activity from the Particles of Light which enter their Composition?" Newton was also the first to describe the use of prisms as beam expanders and multiple-prism arrays, which would later become integral to the development of early tunable lasers.

=== Diffractive optics ===
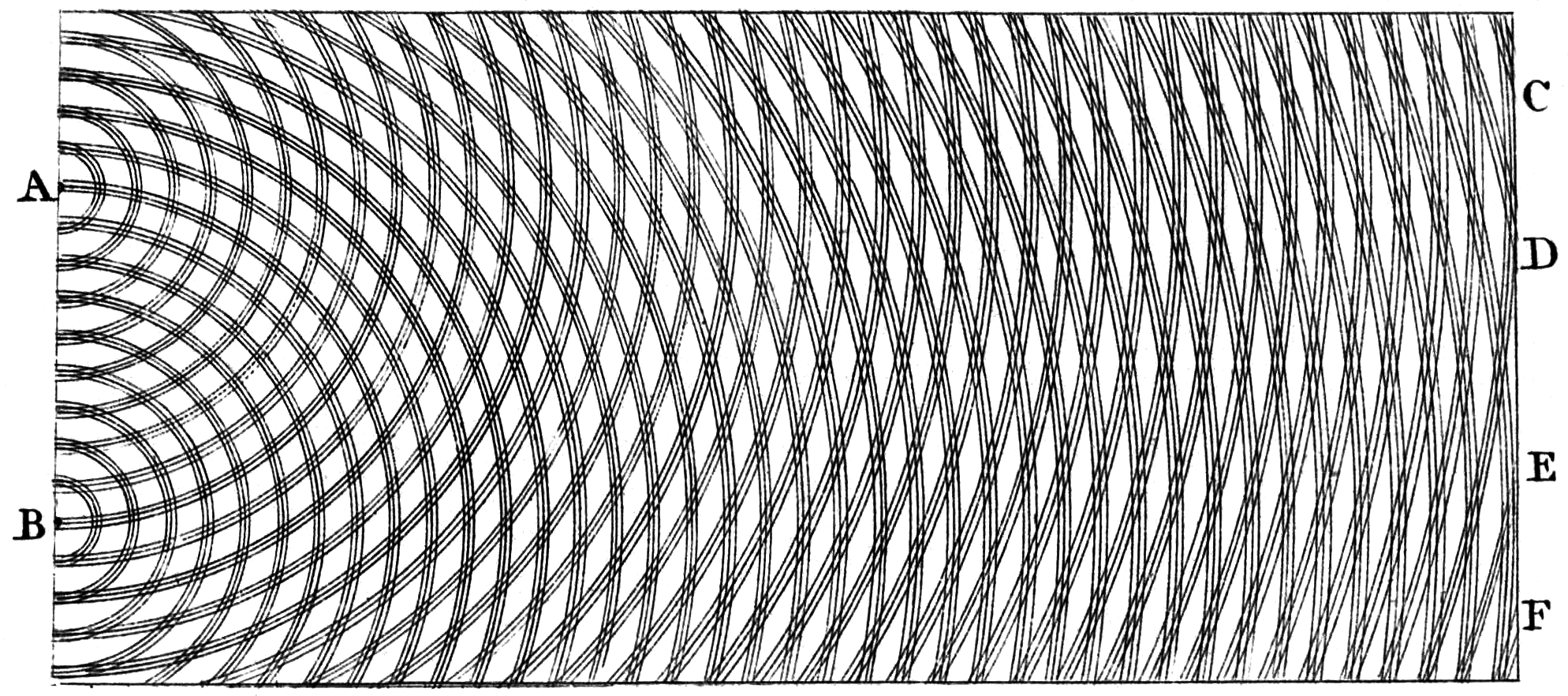
Thomas Young's sketch of interference based on observations of water waves, which he presented to the Royal Society in 1803

The effects of diffraction of light were carefully observed and characterized by Francesco Maria Grimaldi, who also coined the term diffraction, from the Latin diffringere, 'to break into pieces', referring to light breaking up into different directions. The results of Grimaldi's observations were published posthumously in 1665. Isaac Newton studied these effects and attributed them to inflexion of light rays. James Gregory (1638–1675) observed the diffraction patterns caused by a bird feather, which was effectively the first diffraction grating. In 1803 Thomas Young demonstrated interference of water waves in a ripple tank and described diffraction effects from two closely spaced slits illuminated by sunlight. He deduced that light must propagate as waves. Augustin-Jean Fresnel provided an influential mathematical formulation of diffraction, published in 1815 and 1818, and thereby gave great support to the wave theory of light that had been advanced by Christiaan Huygens and reinvigorated by Young, against Newton's particle theory.

== Lenses and lensmaking ==
Although disputed, archeological evidence has been suggested of the use of lenses in ancient times over a period of several millennia. It has been proposed that glass eye covers in hieroglyphs from the Old Kingdom of Egypt (c. 2686–2181 BCE) were functional simple glass meniscus lenses. The so-called Nimrud lens, a rock crystal artifact dated to the 7th century BCE, might have been used as a magnifying glass, although it could have simply been a decoration.

The earliest written record of magnification dates back to the 1st century CE, when Seneca the Younger, a tutor of Emperor Nero, wrote: "Letters, however small and indistinct, are seen enlarged and more clearly through a globe or glass filled with water." Emperor Nero is also said to have watched the gladiatorial games using an emerald as a corrective lens.

Ibn al-Haytham (Alhacen) wrote about the effects of pinhole, concave lenses, and magnifying glasses in his 11th century Book of Optics (1021 CE). The English friar Roger Bacon, during the 1260s or 1270s, wrote works on optics, partly based on the works of Arab writers, that described the function of corrective lenses for vision and burning glasses. These volumes were outlines for a larger publication that was never produced, so his ideas never saw mass dissemination.

Between the 11th and 13th centuries, so-called "reading stones" were invented. Often used by monks to assist in illuminating manuscripts, these were primitive plano-convex lenses, initially made by cutting a glass sphere in half. As the stones were experimented with, it was slowly understood that shallower lenses magnified more effectively. Around 1286, possibly in Pisa, Italy, the first pair of eyeglasses was made, although it is unclear who the inventor was.

The earliest known working telescopes were the refracting telescopes that appeared in the Netherlands in 1608. Their inventor is unknown: Hans Lippershey applied for the first patent that year followed by a patent application by Jacob Metius of Alkmaar two weeks later (neither was granted since examples of the device seemed to be numerous at the time). Galileo greatly improved upon these designs the following year. Isaac Newton is credited with constructing the first functional reflecting telescope in 1668, his Newtonian reflector.

The earliest known examples of compound microscopes, which combine an objective lens near the specimen with an eyepiece to view a real image, appeared in Europe around 1620. The design is very similar to the telescope and, like that device, its inventor is unknown. Again claims revolve around the spectacle making centers in the Netherlands including claims it was invented in 1590 by Zacharias Janssen and/or his father, Hans Martens, claims it was invented by rival spectacle maker, Hans Lippershey, and claims it was invented by expatriate Cornelis Drebbel who was noted to have a version in London in 1619.

Galileo Galilei (also sometimes cited as a compound microscope inventor) seems to have found after 1609 that he could close focus his telescope to view small objects and, after seeing a compound microscope built by Drebbel exhibited in Rome in 1624, built his own improved version. The name microscope was coined by Giovanni Faber, who gave that name to Galileo Galilei's compound microscope in 1625.

== Quantum optics ==
Light is made up of particles called photons and hence inherently is quantized. Quantum optics is the study of the nature and effects of light as quantized photons. The first indication that light might be quantized came from Max Planck in 1899 when he correctly modelled blackbody radiation by assuming that the exchange of energy between light and matter only occurred in discrete amounts he called quanta. It was unknown whether the source of this discreteness was the matter or the light. In 1905, Albert Einstein published the theory of the photoelectric effect. It appeared that the only possible explanation for the effect was the quantization of light itself. Later, Niels Bohr showed that atoms could only emit discrete amounts of energy. The understanding of the interaction between light and matter following from these developments not only formed the basis of quantum optics but also were crucial for the development of quantum mechanics as a whole. However, the subfields of quantum mechanics dealing with matter-light interaction were principally regarded as research into matter rather than into light and hence, one rather spoke of atom physics and quantum electronics.

This changed with the invention of the maser in 1953 and the laser in 1960. Laser science—research into principles, design and application of these devices—became an important field, and the quantum mechanics underlying the laser's principles was studied now with more emphasis on the properties of light, and the name quantum optics became customary.

As laser science needed good theoretical foundations, and also because research into these soon proved very fruitful, interest in quantum optics rose. Following the work of Dirac in quantum field theory, George Sudarshan, Roy J. Glauber, and Leonard Mandel applied quantum theory to the electromagnetic field in the 1950s and 1960s to gain a more detailed understanding of photodetection and the statistics of light (see degree of coherence). This led to the introduction of the coherent state as a quantum description of laser light and the realization that some states of light could not be described with classical waves. In 1977, Kimble et al. demonstrated the first source of light which required a quantum description: a single atom that emitted one photon at a time. Another quantum state of light with certain advantages over any classical state, squeezed light, was soon proposed. At the same time, development of short and ultrashort laser pulses—created by Q-switching and mode-locking techniques—opened the way to the study of unimaginably fast ("ultrafast") processes. Applications for solid state research (e.g. Raman spectroscopy) were found, and mechanical forces of light on matter were studied. The latter led to levitating and positioning clouds of atoms or even small biological samples in an optical trap or optical tweezers by laser beam. This, along with Doppler cooling was the crucial technology needed to achieve the celebrated Bose–Einstein condensation.

Other remarkable results are the demonstration of quantum entanglement, quantum teleportation, and (recently, in 1995) quantum logic gates. The latter are of much interest in quantum information theory, a subject which partly emerged from quantum optics, partly from theoretical computer science.

Today's fields of interest among quantum optics researchers include parametric down-conversion, parametric oscillation, even shorter (attosecond) light pulses, use of quantum optics for quantum information, manipulation of single atoms and Bose–Einstein condensates, their application, and how to manipulate them (a sub-field often called atom optics).

== See also ==
- Giambattista della Porta
- List of astronomical instrument makers

== Notes ==
=== Works cited ===
- Elliott, Robert Stratman (1966). Electromagnetics. McGraw-Hill.
- Wade, Nicholas J.; Finger, Stanley (2001), "The eye as an optical instrument: from camera obscura to Helmholtz's perspective", Perception, 30 (10): 1157–77, doi:10.1068/p3210, PMID 11721819, S2CID 8185797
