= Sorbon =

- Commune
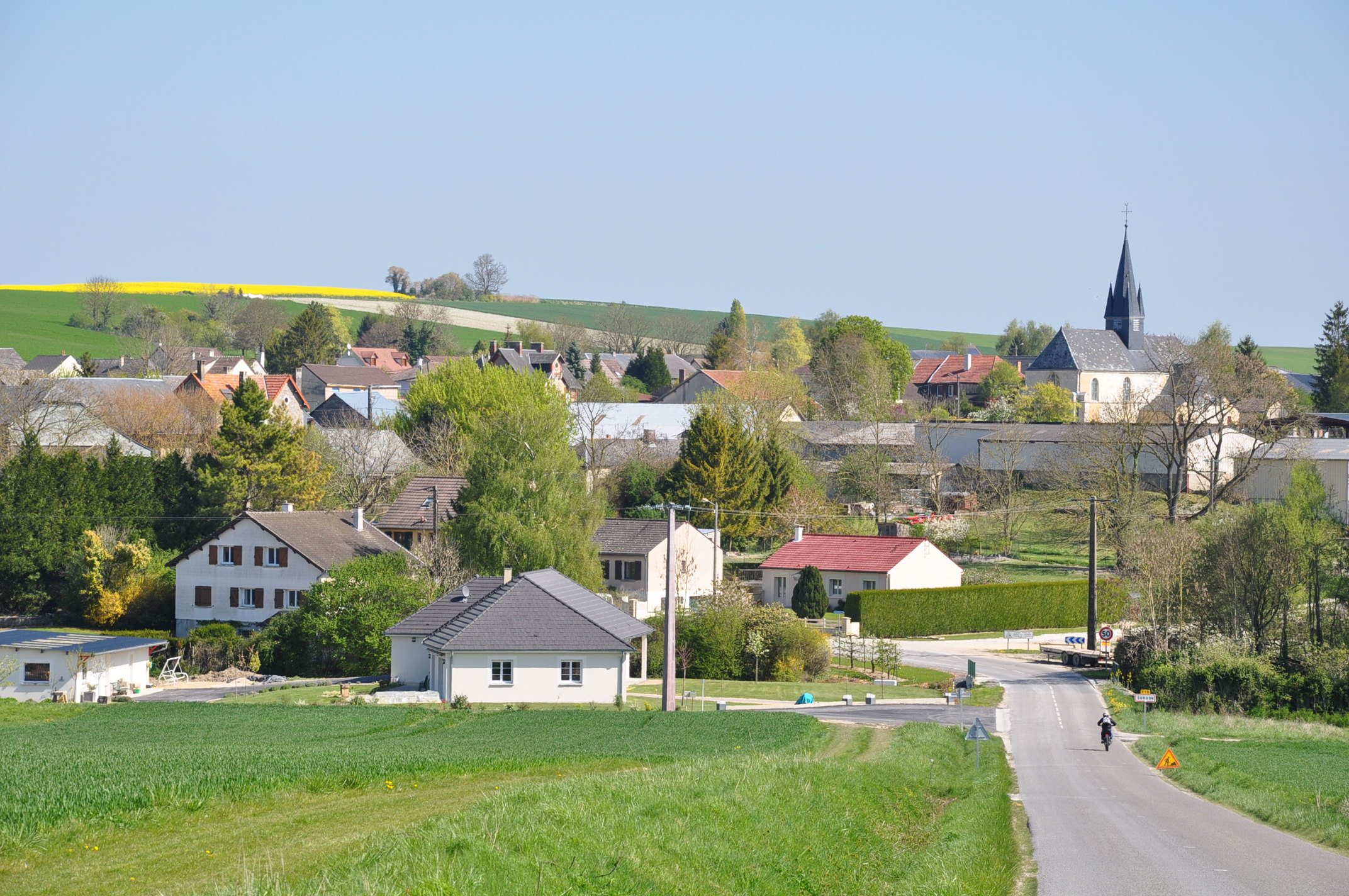
- View of the village

- Coat of arms
- Location of Sorbon
- Location within France Location within Grand Est
- Coordinates: 49°32′23″N 4°21′19″E
- Country: France
- Region: Grand Est
- Department: Ardennes
- Arrondissement: Rethel
- Canton: Rethel

Government
  - Mayor (2020–2026): Benoît Willemet
- Area^{1}: 14.43 km^{2} (5.57 sq mi)
- Elevation: 120 m (390 ft)
- Population (2023): 222
  - Density: 15.4/km^{2} (39.8/sq mi)
- Time zone: UTC+01:00 (CET)
  - Summer (DST): UTC+02:00 (CEST)
- INSEE/Postal code: 08427 /08300
- ^{1} French Land Register data, which excludes lakes, ponds, glaciers > 1 km^{2} (0.386 sq mi or 247 acres) and river estuaries.

Sorbon (French pronunciation: [sɔʁbɔ̃]) is a commune of the Ardennes department in northern France.

== Population ==
Historical population
Year	Pop.	±% p.a.
1968	210	—
1975	211	+0.07%
1982	216	+0.34%
1990	224	+0.46%
1999	216	−0.40%
2007	208	−0.47%
2012	203	−0.49%
2017	196	−0.70%
2023	222	+2.10%
Source: INSEE

== Notable people ==
It was the birthplace of Robert de Sorbon, (1201–1274), who was a chaplain and Confessor to King Louis IX of France, as well as the founder of the Sorbonne, the University of Paris.

== See also ==
- Communes of the Ardennes department
