= University of Paris Faculty of Theology =

Faculty of French university

Faculty of Theology of Paris
- Faculté de Théologie de Paris
- Type: Corporative, then public
- Active: 1200; 826 years ago 1808; 218 years ago (refoundation)–1885
- Parent institution: Ancient University of Paris (1200-1793)
- Dean: Jean Mulot (last)
- Location: Paris, France
- Campus: Urban
- Language: French, Latin
- Current successors: Catholic University of Paris; École pratique des hautes études

The Faculty of Theology of Paris is one of the four faculties of the former University of Paris. Closed in 1793, it was reborn in 1808 as the Catholic theology faculty of Paris within the Académie de Paris of the Imperial University of France. In 1877, the Faculty of Protestant Theology was also created following the loss of Alsace-Lorraine and the Strasbourg theology faculty. It was abolished in 1885 and replaced by a new section in « Religious studies » of the École Pratique des Hautes Études (EPHE). Jean Mulot was its last dean.

It was based at the Sorbonne and its premises were inherited by the École Nationale des Chartes. A new theology faculty, called the Theologicum, was created in 1889 by Pope Leo XIII within the Catholic University of Paris to replace the public Catholic theology faculty. To this day, this faculty retains the traditions of the theology faculty of the former College of Sorbonne, founded in the 12th century.

== History ==
=== The Faculty of Theology at the University of Paris from the 13th century to 1793 ===
In 1253, nine of the twelve professorships in the Faculty of Theology were in convents. Between 1373 and 1398, 198 baccalaureate students graduated, including 102 mendicants, 17 monks of the Cîteaux order and 47 seculars. A distinction was made in the Faculty of Theology between students from convents, or colleges of regulars, and secular students from colleges, which already numbered 76 at the beginning of the 14th century.

Following the example of the Dominicans in 1221 (Dominican College), most religious orders founded convents in the university quarter before the 14th century. The convents of the Minors were founded in 1230, the Premonstratensians in 1252, the Bernardins in 1256, the Carmelites in 1259, the Augustinians in 1261 and the Order of Cluny in 1269. Each of these convents had a chair of theology. In 1253, the Mathurins and the Order of Val des Écoliers also had schools of theology. The monasteries of Saint-Denis and Marmoutiers also had a study convent in Paris, the former in 1203 and the latter in 1329. The most important of these colleges of regulars were those of Mendiants and Bernardins.

In 1769, the Faculty of Theology consisted of only two colleges, the College of Sorbonne and the College of Navarre. The College of Sorbonne was staffed by thirty-five doctors and had eleven professors of theology and a chair of Hebrew founded by the Duke of Orléans. The College of Navarre had four royal professors of theology.

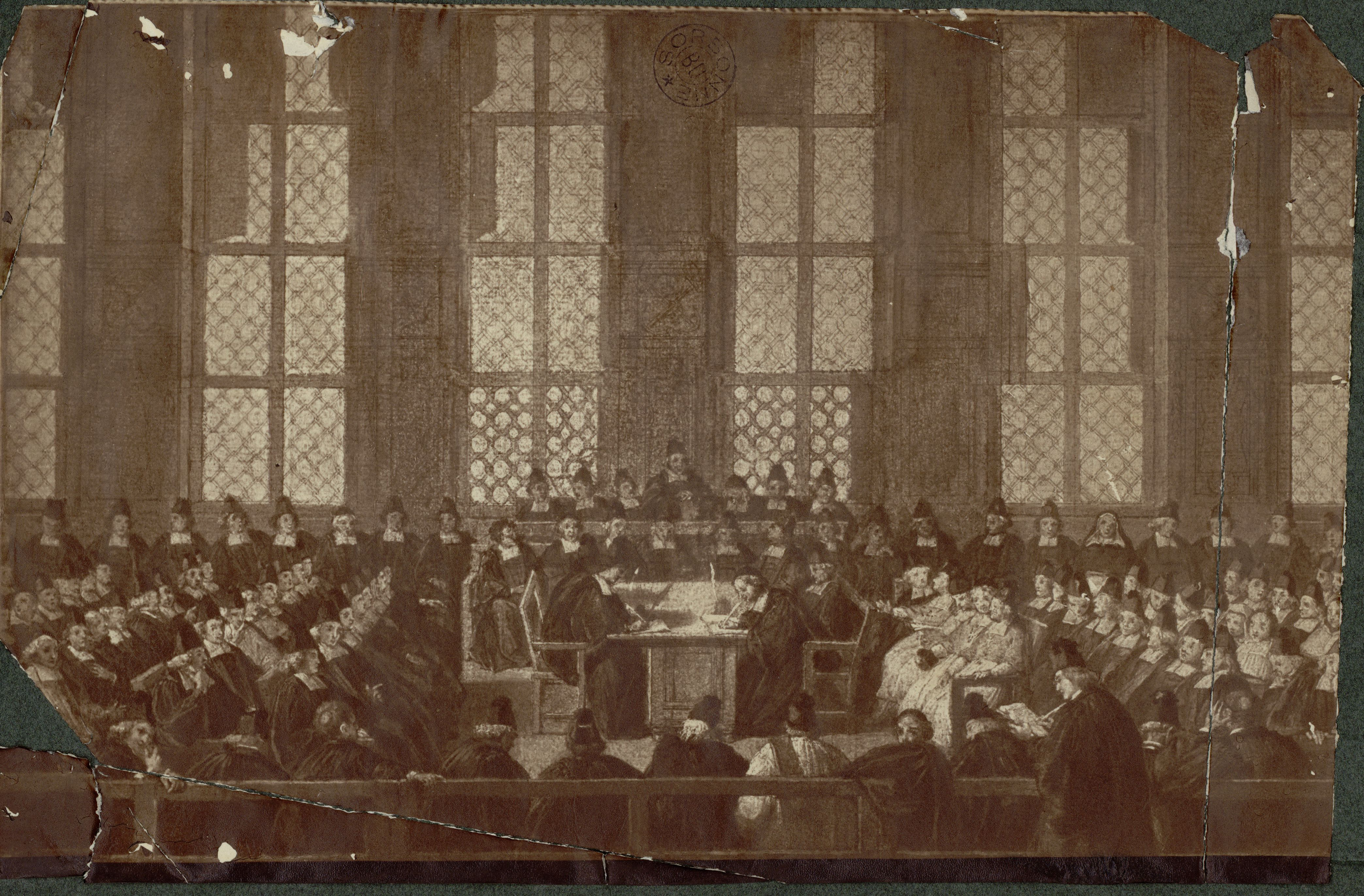
Nicolas-Etienne Edelinck (engraving), Nicolas Vleughels (illustration), La grande salle des Actes en Sorbonne un jour d'assemblée de la Faculté de théologie le 5 mars 1717 (The Great Hall of Acts at the Sorbonne on the day of the assembly of the Faculty of Theology). (Sorbonne Library, NuBIS).

=== The Catholic theology faculty of Paris from 1808 to 1885 ===
A new theology faculty was created in 1808, but it was not recognised by the Holy See and clerics were trained almost exclusively in the seminaries. It was poorly attended and awarded few degrees. It finally disappeared in 1885.
