= Robert de Sorbon =

13th century French theologian, founder of the Sorbonne college

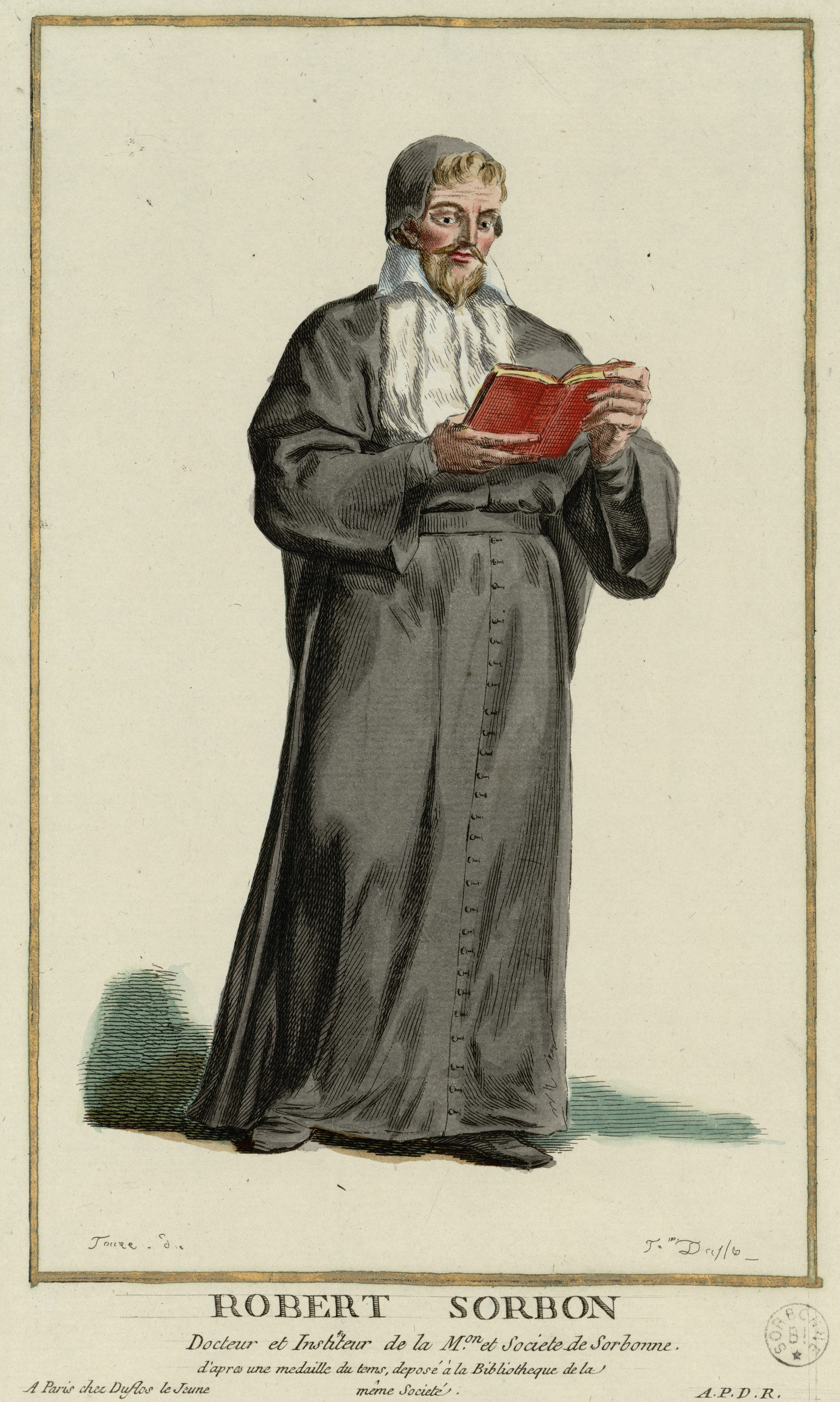
Robert de Sorbon

Robert de Sorbon (French: [ʁɔbɛʁ də sɔʁbɔ̃]; 9 October 1201 – 15 August 1274) was a French theologian, the chaplain of Louis IX of France, and founder of the Sorbonne college in Paris.

== Biography ==
Born into a poor family in Sorbon, in what is now the Ardennes département, Robert de Sorbon entered the Church and was educated in Reims and Paris. He was noted for his piety and attracted the patronage of the Comte d'Artois and King Louis IX of France, later known as Saint Louis. He became the canon of Cambrai around 1251 before being appointed canon of Paris and the king's confessor in 1258.

Sorbon began to teach around 1253 and in 1257 established the Maison de Sorbonne, a college in Paris originally intended to teach theology to twenty poor students. It was sponsored by King Louis and received the endorsement of Pope Alexander IV in 1259. He was assisted by Peter of Limoges. It subsequently grew into a major centre of learning and became the core of what would become the University of Paris. Sorbon served as chancellor of the university, taught and preached there from 1258 until his death.

He died in Paris in 1274.

The library at the University of Reims, which opened in 2006, is named after Robert de Sorbon.
