= List of things named after Euclid =

This is a list of topics named after the Greek mathematician Euclid.

== Mathematics ==
=== Number theory ===
- Euclidean algorithm
  - Extended Euclidean algorithm
- Euclidean division
- Euclid–Euler theorem
- Euclid number
- Euclid's lemma
- Euclid's orchard
- Euclid–Mullin sequence
- Euclid's theorem

=== Algebra ===
- Euclidean domain
- Euclidean field

=== Geometry ===
- Euclidean group
- Euclidean geometry
  - Non-Euclidean geometry
- Euclid's formula
- Euclidean distance
  - Euclidean distance matrix
- Euclidean space
  - Pseudo-Euclidean space
- Euclidean vector
- Euclidean relation
- Euclidean topology
- Euclid's fifth postulate

== Other ==
- Euclid's Elements
- Euclid's Optics
- Euclid (space telescope)
- Euclides, crater on the Moon
- 4354 Euclides, main-belt asteroid
- Euclid Trucks
- Euclid, Ohio
- Euclid, Minnesota
- Euclidean rhythm a term coined by Godfried Toussaint in his 2005 paper "The Euclidean Algorithm Generates Traditional Musical Rhythms"
- Euclid (computer program)
- Euclid (programming language)
- Euclidiea (video game)
- Euclid, a supercomputer built by the fictional character Maximillian Cohen in the 1998 film π
- Euclid Creek
- Euclid Avenue, a street in Manassas, Virginia
- Euclid Avenue, a street in Arlington Heights, Illinois
- Euclid Avenue, a street in Miami Beach, Florida
- Euclid Avenue, a street in Des Moines, Iowa
- Euclid Crescent, a street in Dundee, Scotland
- Euclid St, a street in Orange County, California
- Euclid Avenue, a street in Toronto, Ontario
- Euclid, an object designation within the SCP Foundation stories, denoting an anomaly that is difficult, but fairly straightforward to contain.
- Mount Euclid in New Zealand's Paparoa Range was named after him in 1970 by the Department of Scientific and Industrial Research.
- Euclidate
