= Riphean =

Riphean may refer to

- Riphean Mountains, mentioned by authors of classical antiquity
- Ural Mountains, believed by some to be the Riphean mountains
- Riphean age, an age in the geological timescale named after the Urals
