= Euclid =

Ancient Greek mathematician (fl. 300 BC)

- Εὐκλείδης
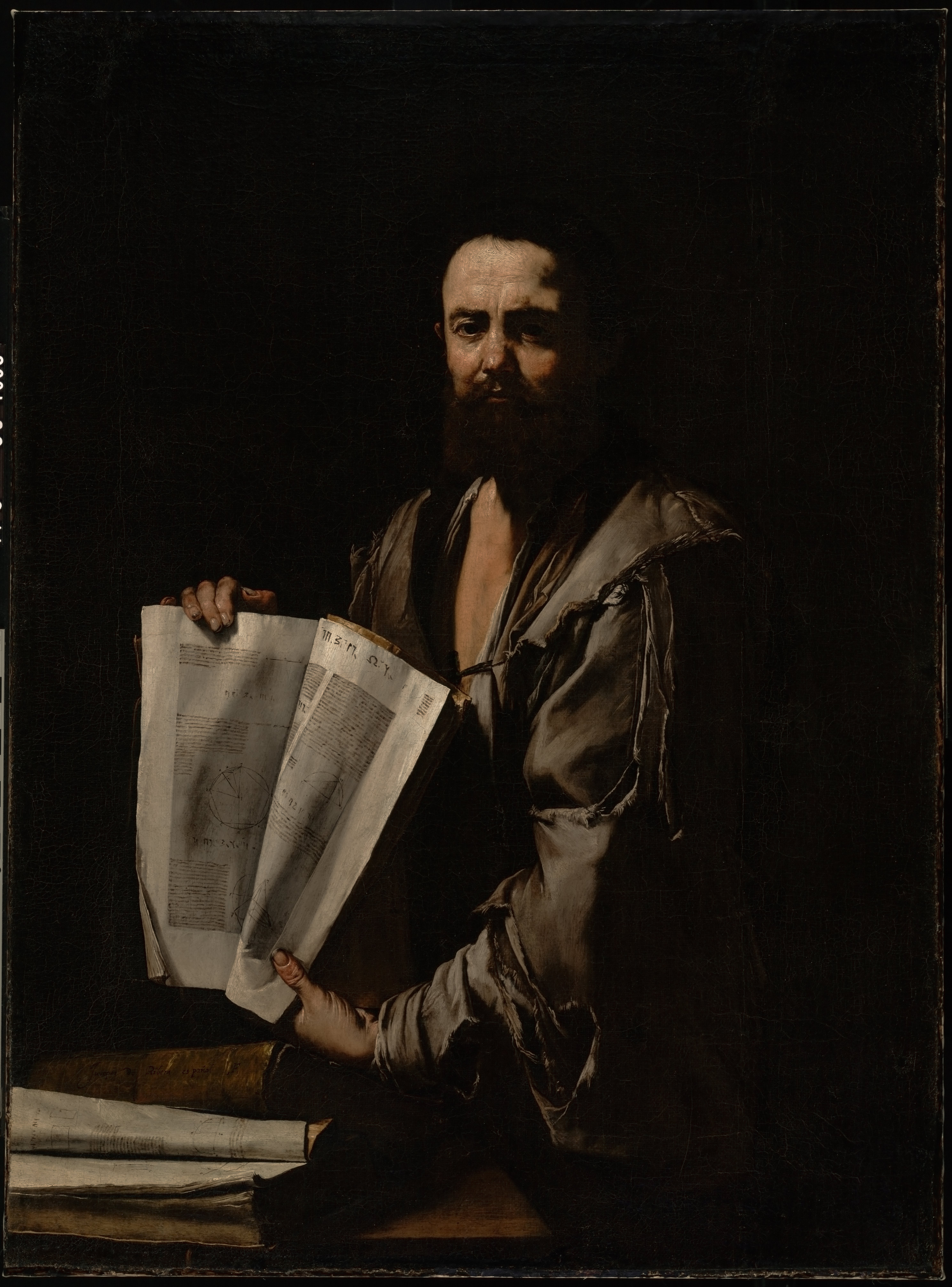
- Euclid by Jusepe de Ribera, c. 1630–1635
- Years active: fl. 300 BC
- Known for: The Elements; Optics; Data; Various concepts: Euclidean geometry; Euclidean algorithm; Euclid's theorem; Euclidean relation; Euclid's formula; Numerous other namesakes
- Scientific career
- Fields: Mathematics (Geometry)

Euclid (/ˈjuːklɪd/; Ancient Greek: Εὐκλείδης; fl. 300 BC) was an ancient Greek mathematician active as a geometer and logician. Considered the "father of geometry", he is chiefly known for the Elements treatise, which established the foundations of geometry that largely dominated the field until the early 19th century. His system, now referred to as Euclidean geometry, involved innovations in combination with a synthesis of theories from earlier Greek mathematicians, including Eudoxus of Cnidus, Hippocrates of Chios, Thales and Theaetetus. With Archimedes and Apollonius of Perga, Euclid is generally considered among the greatest mathematicians of antiquity, and one of the most influential in the history of mathematics.

Very little is known of Euclid's life, and most information comes from the scholars Proclus and Pappus of Alexandria many centuries later. Medieval Islamic mathematicians invented a fanciful biography, and medieval Byzantine and early Renaissance scholars mistook him for the earlier philosopher Euclid of Megara. It is now generally accepted that he spent his career in Alexandria and lived around 300 BC, after Plato's students and before Archimedes. There is some speculation that Euclid studied at the Platonic Academy and later taught at the Musaeum; he is regarded as bridging the earlier Platonic tradition in Athens with the later tradition of Alexandria.

In the Elements, Euclid deduced the theorems from a small set of axioms. He also wrote works on perspective, conic sections, spherical geometry, number theory, and mathematical rigour. In addition to the Elements, Euclid wrote a central early text in the optics field, Optics, and lesser-known works including Data and Phaenomena. Euclid's authorship of On Divisions of Figures and Catoptrics has been questioned. He is thought to have written many lost works.

== Life ==
=== Traditional narrative ===
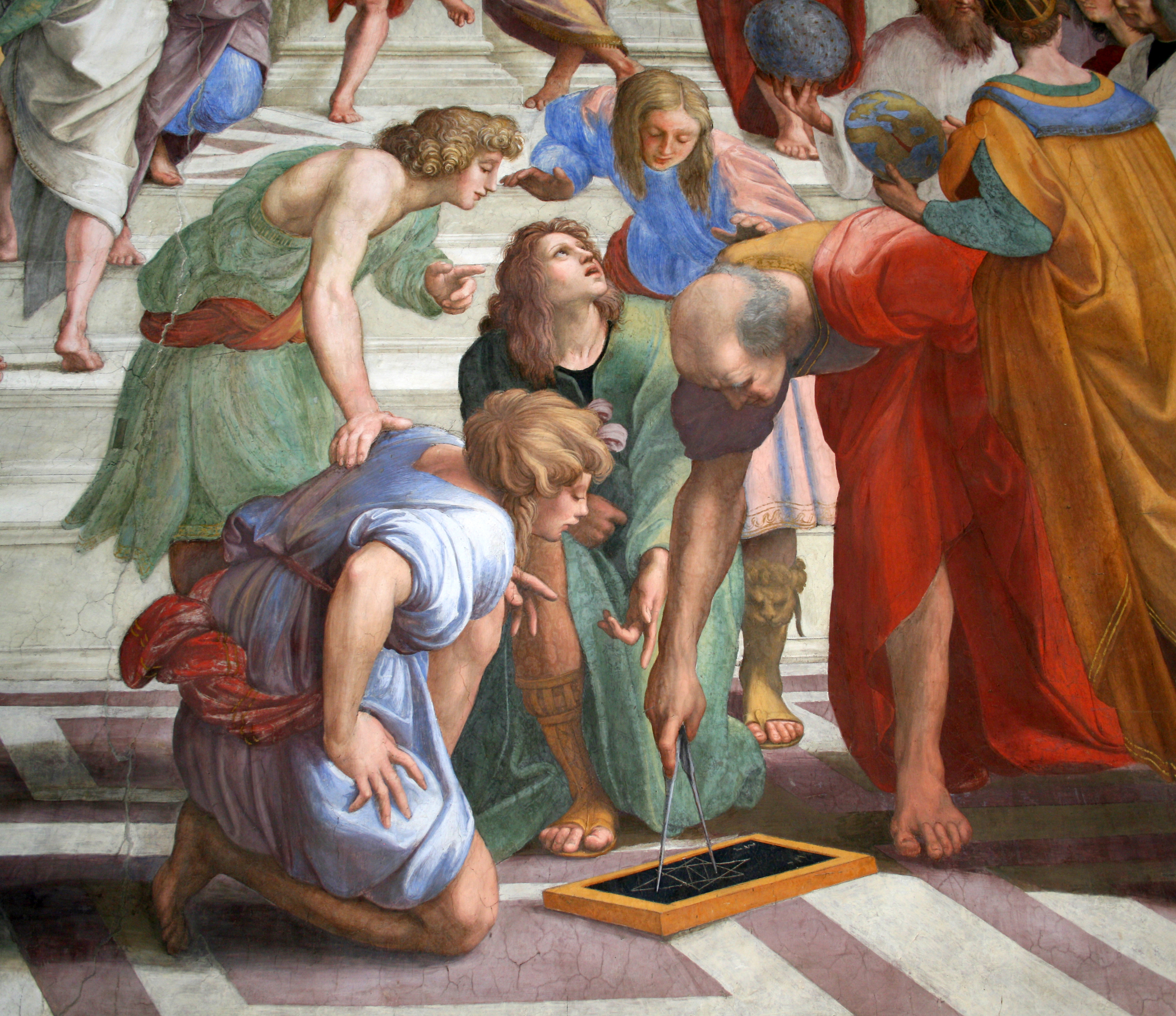
Detail of Raphael's impression of Euclid, teaching students in The School of Athens (1509–1511)

The English name 'Euclid' is the anglicized version of the Ancient Greek name Eukleídes (Εὐκλείδης). (Note: In modern English, 'Euclid' is pronounced as /ˈjuːklɪd/.) It is derived from 'eu-' (εὖ; 'well'), 'klês' (-κλῆς; 'fame'), meaning "renowned, glorious", and the suffix '-ides' (-ίδης, 'son of'). In English, by metonymy, 'Euclid' can mean his most well-known work, Euclid's Elements, or a copy thereof, and is sometimes synonymous with 'geometry'.

As with many ancient Greek mathematicians, the details of Euclid's life are mostly unknown. He is accepted as the author of four mostly extant treatises—the Elements, Optics, Data, Phaenomena—but besides this, there is nothing known for certain of him. (Note: Euclid's oeuvre also includes the treatise On Divisions, which survives fragmented in a later Arabic source. He authored numerous lost works as well.) The traditional narrative mainly follows the 5th century AD account by Proclus in his Commentary on the First Book of Euclid's Elements, as well as a few anecdotes from Pappus of Alexandria in the early 4th century. (Note: Some of the information from Pappus of Alexandria on Euclid is now lost and was preserved in Proclus's Commentary on the First Book of Euclid's Elements.)

According to Proclus, Euclid lived shortly after several of Plato's (d. 347 BC) followers and before the mathematician Archimedes (c. 287 – c. 212 BC); (Note: Proclus was likely working from (now-lost) 4th-century BC histories of mathematics written by Theophrastus and Eudemus of Rhodes. Proclus explicitly mentions Amyclas of Heracleia, Menaechmus and his brother Dinostratus, Theudius of Magnesia, Athenaeus of Cyzicus, Hermotimus of Colophon, and Philippus of Mende, and says that Euclid came "not long after" these men.) specifically, Proclus placed Euclid during the rule of Ptolemy I (r. 305/304–282 BC). (Note: See Heath 1981, p. 354 for an English translation on Proclus's account of Euclid's life.) Euclid's birthdate is unknown; some scholars estimate around 330 or 325 BC, but others refrain from speculating. It is presumed that he was of Greek descent, but his birthplace is unknown. (Note: Later Arab sources state he was a Greek born in modern-day Tyre, Lebanon, though these accounts are considered dubious and speculative. See Heath 1981, p. 355 for an English translation of the Arab account. He was long held to have been born in Megara, but by the Renaissance it was concluded that he had been confused with the philosopher Euclid of Megara, see §Identity and historicity) Proclus (a Neoplatonist) held that Euclid followed the Platonic tradition, but there is no definitive confirmation for this. It is unlikely he was a contemporary of Plato, so it is often presumed that he was educated by Plato's disciples at the Platonic Academy in Athens. Historian Thomas Heath supported this theory, noting that most capable geometers lived in Athens, including many of those whose work Euclid built on; historian Michalis Sialaros considers this a mere conjecture. In any event, the contents of Euclid's work demonstrate familiarity with the Platonic geometry tradition.

In his Collection, Pappus mentions that Apollonius studied with Euclid's students in Alexandria, and this has been taken to imply that Euclid worked and founded a mathematical tradition there. The city was founded by Alexander the Great in 331 BC, and the rule of Ptolemy I from 306 BC onwards gave it a stability which was relatively unique amid the chaotic wars over dividing Alexander's empire. Ptolemy began a process of hellenization and commissioned numerous constructions, building the massive Musaeum institution, which was a leading center of education. (Note: The Musaeum would later include the famous Library of Alexandria, but it was likely founded later, during the reign of Ptolemy II Philadelphus (285–246 BC).) Euclid is speculated to have been among the Musaeum's first scholars. Euclid's date of death is unknown; it has been speculated that he died c. 270 BC.

=== Identity and historicity ===
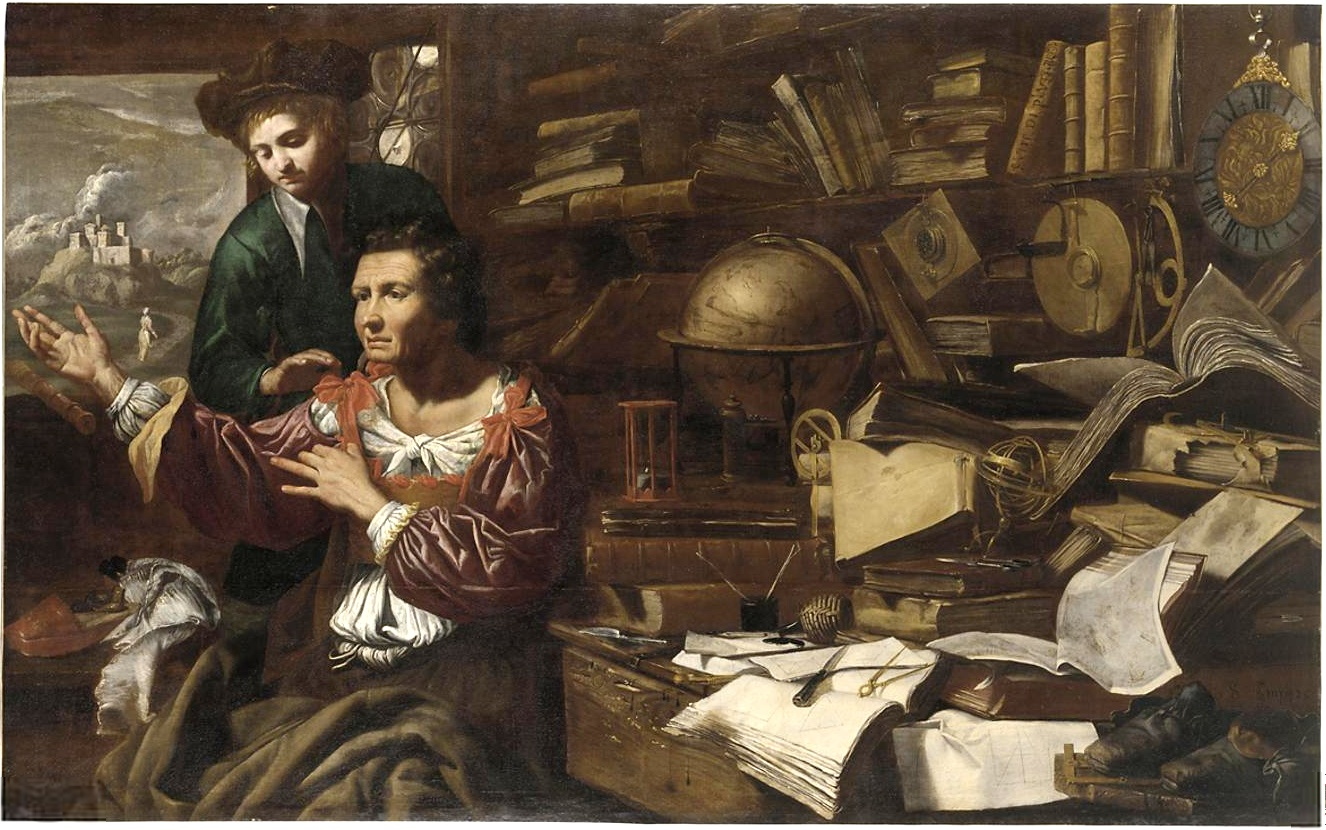
Domenico Maroli's 1650s painting Euclide di Megara si traveste da donna per recarsi ad Atene a seguire le lezioni di Socrate [Euclid of Megara Dressing as a Woman to Hear Socrates Teach in Athens]. At the time, Euclid the philosopher and Euclid the mathematician were wrongly considered the same person, so this painting includes mathematical objects on the table.

Euclid is often referred to as 'Euclid of Alexandria' to differentiate him from the earlier philosopher Euclid of Megara, a pupil of Socrates included in dialogues of Plato with whom he was historically conflated. Valerius Maximus, the 1st century AD Roman compiler of anecdotes, mistakenly substituted Euclid's name for Eudoxus (4th century BC) as the mathematician to whom Plato sent those asking how to double the cube. Perhaps on the basis of this mention of a mathematical Euclid roughly a century early, Euclid became mixed up with Euclid of Megara in medieval Byzantine sources (now lost), eventually leading Euclid the mathematician to be ascribed details of both men's biographies and described as Megarensis (lit. 'of Megara'). The Byzantine scholar Theodore Metochites (c. 1300) explicitly conflated the two Euclids, as did printer Erhard Ratdolt's 1482 editio princeps of Campanus of Novara's Latin translation of the Elements. After the mathematician Bartolomeo Zamberti appended most of the extant biographical fragments about either Euclid to the preface of his 1505 translation of the Elements, subsequent publications passed on this identification. A further confusion, which gives the birthplace of Euclid as Gela, Sicily, arises from the fact that Euclid of Megara is sometimes said to have been born in Gela. Later Renaissance scholars, particularly Peter Ramus, reevaluated this claim, proving it false via issues in chronology and contradiction in early sources.

Medieval Arabic sources give vast amounts of information concerning Euclid's life, but are completely unverifiable. Euclid, who was supposedly a Tyre-born Greek domiciled at Damascus, was claimed to have been the son of Naucrates. Most scholars consider them of dubious authenticity. Heath in particular contends that the fictionalization was done to strengthen the connection between a revered mathematician and the Arab world. There are also numerous anecdotal stories concerning to Euclid, all of uncertain historicity, which "picture him as a kindly and gentle old man". The best known of these is Proclus' story about Ptolemy asking Euclid if there was a quicker path to learning geometry than reading his Elements, which Euclid replied with "there is no royal road to geometry". This anecdote is questionable since a very similar interaction between Menaechmus and Alexander the Great is recorded from Stobaeus. Both accounts were written in the 5th century AD, neither indicates its source, and neither appears in ancient Greek literature.

Any firm dating of Euclid's activity c. 300 BC is called into question by a lack of contemporary references. The earliest original reference to Euclid is in Apollonius' prefatory letter to the Conics (early 2nd century BC): "The third book of the Conics contains many astonishing theorems that are useful for both the syntheses and the determinations of number of solutions of solid loci. Most of these, and the finest of them, are novel. And when we discovered them we realized that Euclid had not made the synthesis of the locus on three and four lines but only an accidental fragment of it, and even that was not felicitously done." The Elements is speculated to have been at least partly in circulation by the 3rd century BC, as Archimedes and Apollonius take several of its propositions for granted; however, Archimedes employs an older variant of the theory of proportions than the one found in the Elements. The oldest physical copies of material included in the Elements, dating from roughly 100 AD, can be found on papyrus fragments unearthed in an ancient rubbish heap from Oxyrhynchus, Roman Egypt. The oldest extant direct citations to the Elements in works whose dates are firmly known are not until the 2nd century AD, by Galen and Alexander of Aphrodisias; by this time it was a standard school text. Some ancient Greek mathematicians mention Euclid by name, but he is usually referred to as "ὁ στοιχειώτης" ("the author of Elements"). In the Middle Ages, some scholars contended Euclid was not a historical personage and that his name arose from a corruption of Greek mathematical terms.

== Works ==
=== Elements ===
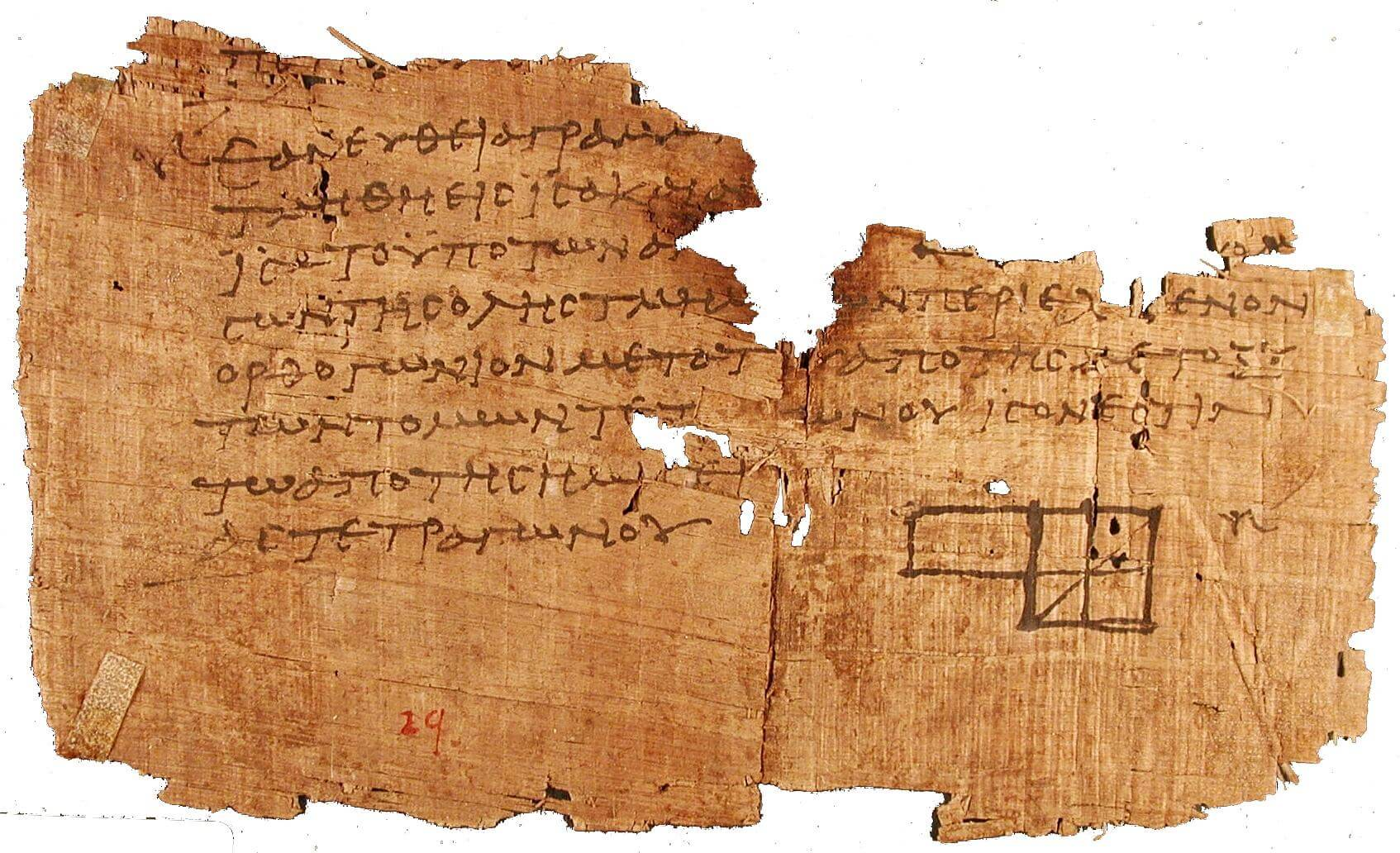
A papyrus fragment of Euclid's Elements dated to c. 75–125 AD. Found at Oxyrhynchus, the diagram accompanies Book II, Proposition 5.

Euclid is best known for his thirteen-book treatise, the Elements (Ancient Greek: Στοιχεῖα; Stoicheia), considered his magnum opus. Much of its content originates from earlier mathematicians, including Eudoxus, Hippocrates of Chios, Thales and Theaetetus, while other theorems are mentioned by Plato and Aristotle. It is difficult to differentiate the work of Euclid from that of his predecessors, especially because the Elements essentially superseded much earlier and now-lost Greek mathematics. (Note: The Elements version available today also includes "post-Euclidean" mathematics, probably added later by later editors such as the mathematician Theon of Alexandria in the 4th century.) The classicist Markus Asper concludes that "apparently Euclid's achievement consists of assembling accepted mathematical knowledge into a cogent order and adding new proofs to fill in the gaps" and the historian Serafina Cuomo described it as a "reservoir of results". Despite this, Sialaros furthers that "the remarkably tight structure of the Elements reveals authorial control beyond the limits of a mere editor".

The Elements does not exclusively discuss geometry as is sometimes believed. It is traditionally divided into three topics: plane geometry (books 1–6), basic number theory (books 7–10) and solid geometry (books 11–13)—though book 5 (on proportions) and 10 (on irrational lines) do not exactly fit this scheme. The heart of the text is the theorems scattered throughout. Using Aristotle's terminology, these may be generally separated into two categories: "first principles" and "second principles". The first group includes statements labeled as a "definition" (Ancient Greek: ὅρος or ὁρισμός), "postulate" (αἴτημα), or a "common notion" (κοινὴ ἔννοια); only the first book includes postulates—later known as axioms—and common notions. (Note: The use of the term "axiom" instead of "postulate" derives from the choice of Proclus to do so in his highly influential commentary on the Elements. Proclus also substituted the term "hypothesis" instead of "common notion", though preserved "postulate".) The second group consists of propositions, presented alongside mathematical proofs and diagrams. It is unknown if Euclid intended the Elements as a textbook, but its method of presentation makes it a natural fit. As a whole, the authorial voice remains general and impersonal.

==== Contents ====
Euclid's postulates and common notions
No.	Postulates
Let the following be postulated:
1	To draw a straight line from any point to any point
2	To produce a finite straight line continuously in a straight line
3	To describe a circle with any centre and distance
4	That all right angles are equal to one another
5	That, if a straight line falling on two straight lines make the interior angles on the same side less than two right angles, the two straight lines, if produced indefinitely, meet on that side on which are the angles less than the two right angles
No.	Common notions
1	Things which are equal to the same thing are also equal to one another
2	If equals be added to equals, the wholes are equal
3	If equals be subtracted from equals, the remainders are equal
4	Things which coincide with one another are equal to one another
5	The whole is greater than the part

Book 1 of the Elements is foundational for the entire text. It begins with a series of 20 definitions for basic geometric concepts such as lines, angles and various regular polygons. Euclid then presents 10 assumptions (see table, right), grouped into five postulates (axioms) and five common notions. (Note: The distinction between these categories is not immediately clear; postulates may simply refer to geometry specifically, while common notions are more general in scope.) These assumptions are intended to provide the logical basis for every subsequent theorem, i.e. serve as an axiomatic system. (Note: The mathematician Gerard Venema notes that this axiomatic system is not complete: "Euclid assumed more than just what he stated in the postulates".) The common notions exclusively concern the comparison of magnitudes. While postulates 1 through 4 are relatively straightforward, (Note: See Heath 1908, pp. 195–201 for a detailed overview of postulates 1 through 4) the 5th is known as the parallel postulate and particularly famous. (Note: Since antiquity, enormous amounts of scholarship have been written about the 5th postulate, usually from mathematicians attempting to prove the postulate—which would make it different from the other, unprovable, four postulates.) Book 1 also includes 48 propositions, which can be loosely divided into those concerning basic theorems and constructions of plane geometry and triangle congruence (1–26); parallel lines (27–34); the area of triangles and parallelograms (35–45); and the Pythagorean theorem (46–48). The last of these includes the earliest surviving proof of the Pythagorean theorem, described by Sialaros as "remarkably delicate".

Book 2 is traditionally understood as concerning "geometric algebra", though this interpretation has been heavily debated since the 1970s; critics describe the characterization as anachronistic, since the foundations of even nascent algebra occurred many centuries later. The second book has a more focused scope and mostly provides algebraic theorems to accompany various geometric shapes. It focuses on the area of rectangles and squares (see Quadrature), and leads up to a geometric precursor of the law of cosines. Book 3 focuses on circles, while the 4th discusses regular polygons, especially the pentagon. Book 5 is among the work's most important sections and presents what is usually termed as the "general theory of proportion". (Note: Much of Book 5 was probably ascertained from earlier mathematicians, perhaps Eudoxus.) Book 6 utilizes the "theory of ratios" in the context of plane geometry. It is built almost entirely of its first proposition: "Triangles and parallelograms which are under the same height are to one another as their bases".

The five Platonic solids, foundational components of solid geometry which feature in Books 11–13

From Book 7 onwards, the mathematician Benno Artmann notes that "Euclid starts afresh. Nothing from the preceding books is used". Number theory is covered by books 7 to 10, the former beginning with a set of 22 definitions for parity, prime numbers and other arithmetic-related concepts. Book 7 includes the Euclidean algorithm, a method for finding the greatest common divisor of two numbers. The 8th book discusses geometric progressions, while book 9 includes the proposition, now called Euclid's theorem, that there are infinitely many prime numbers. Of the Elements, book 10 is by far the largest and most complex, dealing with irrational numbers in the context of magnitudes.

The final three books (11–13) primarily discuss solid geometry. By introducing a list of 37 definitions, Book 11 contextualizes the next two. Although its foundational character resembles Book 1, unlike the latter it features no axiomatic system or postulates. The three sections of Book 11 include content on solid geometry (1–19), solid angles (20–23) and parallelepipedal solids (24–37).

=== Other works ===
Euclid's construction of a regular dodecahedron

In addition to the Elements, at least five works of Euclid have survived to the present day. They follow the same logical structure as Elements, with definitions and proved propositions.

- Catoptrics concerns the mathematical theory of mirrors, particularly the images formed in plane and spherical concave mirrors, though the attribution is sometimes questioned.
- The Data (Ancient Greek: Δεδομένα), is a somewhat short text which deals with the nature and implications of "given" information in geometrical problems.
- On Divisions (Ancient Greek: Περὶ Διαιρέσεων) survives only partially in Arabic translation, and concerns the division of geometrical figures into two or more equal parts or into parts in given ratios. It includes thirty-six propositions and is similar to Apollonius' Conics.
- The Optics (Ancient Greek: Ὀπτικά) is the earliest surviving Greek treatise on perspective. It includes an introductory discussion of geometrical optics and basic rules of perspective.
- The Phaenomena (Ancient Greek: Φαινόμενα) is a treatise on spherical astronomy, survives in Greek; it is similar to On the Moving Sphere by Autolycus of Pitane, who flourished around 310 BC.

=== Lost works ===
Four other works are credibly attributed to Euclid, but have been lost.

- The Conics (Ancient Greek: Κωνικά) was a four-book survey on conic sections, which was later superseded by Apollonius' more comprehensive treatment of the same name. The work's existence is known primarily from Pappus, who asserts that the first four books of Apollonius' Conics are largely based on Euclid's earlier work. Doubt has been cast on this assertion by the historian Alexander Jones, owing to sparse evidence and no other corroboration of Pappus' account.
- The Pseudaria (Ancient Greek: Ψευδάρια; lit. 'Fallacies'), was—according to Proclus in (70.1–18)—a text in geometrical reasoning, written to advise beginners in avoiding common fallacies. Very little is known of its specific contents aside from its scope and a few extant lines.
- The Porisms (Ancient Greek: Πορίσματα; lit. 'Corollaries') was, based on accounts from Pappus and Proclus, probably a three-book treatise with approximately 200 propositions. The term 'porism' in this context does not refer to a corollary, but to "a third type of proposition—an intermediate between a theorem and a problem—the aim of which is to discover a feature of an existing geometrical entity, for example, to find the centre of a circle". The mathematician Michel Chasles speculated that these now-lost propositions included content related to the modern theories of transversals and projective geometry. (Note: See Jones 1986, pp. 547–572 for further information on the Porisms)
- The Surface Loci (Ancient Greek: Τόποι πρὸς ἐπιφανείᾳ) is of virtually unknown contents, aside from speculation based on the work's title. Conjecture based on later accounts has suggested it discussed cones and cylinders, among other subjects.

== Legacy ==
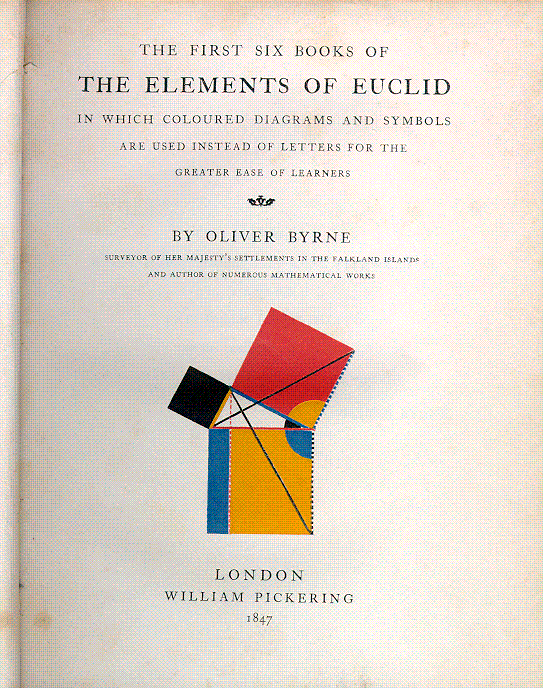
The cover page of Oliver Byrne's 1847 colored edition of the Elements

Euclid is generally considered with Archimedes and Apollonius of Perga as among the greatest mathematicians of antiquity. Many commentators cite him as one of the most influential figures in the history of mathematics. The geometrical system established by the Elements long dominated the field; however, today that system is often referred to as 'Euclidean geometry' to distinguish it from other non-Euclidean geometries discovered in the early 19th century. Among Euclid's many namesakes are the European Space Agency's (ESA) Euclid space telescope, the lunar crater Euclides, and the minor planet 4354 Euclides.

The Elements is often considered after the Bible as the most frequently translated, published, and studied book in the Western World's history. With Aristotle's Metaphysics, the Elements is perhaps the most successful ancient Greek text, and was the dominant mathematical textbook in the Medieval Arab and Latin worlds.

The first English edition of the Elements was published in 1570 by Henry Billingsley and John Dee. The mathematician Oliver Byrne published a well-known version of the Elements in 1847 entitled The First Six Books of the Elements of Euclid in Which Coloured Diagrams and Symbols Are Used Instead of Letters for the Greater Ease of Learners, which included colored diagrams intended to increase its pedagogical effect. David Hilbert authored a modern axiomatization of the Elements. Edna St. Vincent Millay wrote that "Euclid alone has looked on Beauty bare."
