= Euclides (crater) =

Crater on the Moon

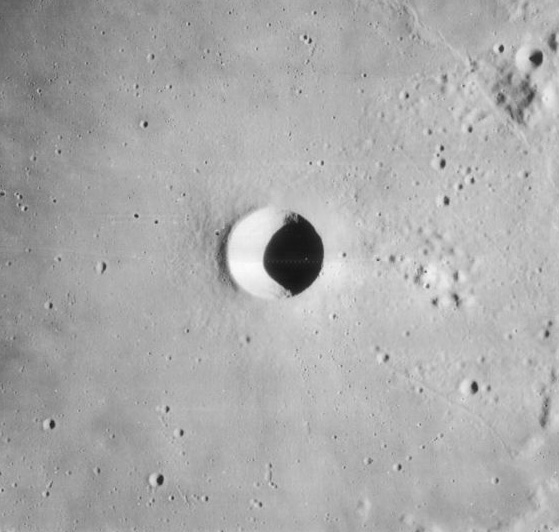
- Lunar Orbiter 4 image
- Coordinates: 7.4°S 29.5°W
- Diameter: 11.80 km (7.33 mi)
- Depth: 2.55 km (1.58 mi)
- Colongitude: 29° at sunrise
- Eponym: Euclid

Euclides is a small lunar impact crater located near the eastern edge of Oceanus Procellarum, about 30 km (19 mi) to the west of the Montes Riphaeus mountains. T. W. Webb called it "the best specimen of an infrequent variety, the 'light-encompassed' crater". It is "deep, regular, not large, bright, and closely surrounded by a luminous cloud". The mare in the vicinity is devoid of significant craters, but to the west is an area of low rises.

Euclides is a bowl-shaped formation with a circular rim. It is surrounded by streaks of ejecta that have a higher albedo than the nearby maria. This nebulous skirt of light-hued material makes this feature very prominent under a high Sun, and it is one of the brightest sites on the Moon.

This crater is named after the Greek mathematician Euclid (unknown-c. 300 B.C.). His name was included in the lunar nomenclature of German astronomer Johann Heinrich von Mädler in 1837. Its designation was formally adopted by the International Astronomical Union in 1935.

== Euclides D ==
Euclides D is a small lunar impact crater in the Mare Cognitum. It has a diameter of 6 kilometers and a depth of 1.3 kilometers. It lies to the southeast of Euclides, beyond the Montes Riphaeus mountains.

In 1976, Euclides D was renamed Eppinger by the IAU to honor Hans Eppinger, a professor of pathological anatomy at Graz. However, in 2002, after Eppinger's association with Nazi prison camps had been brought to the attention of the IAU's Working Group for Planetary System Nomenclature, the name was reverted to Euclides D.

== Satellite craters ==
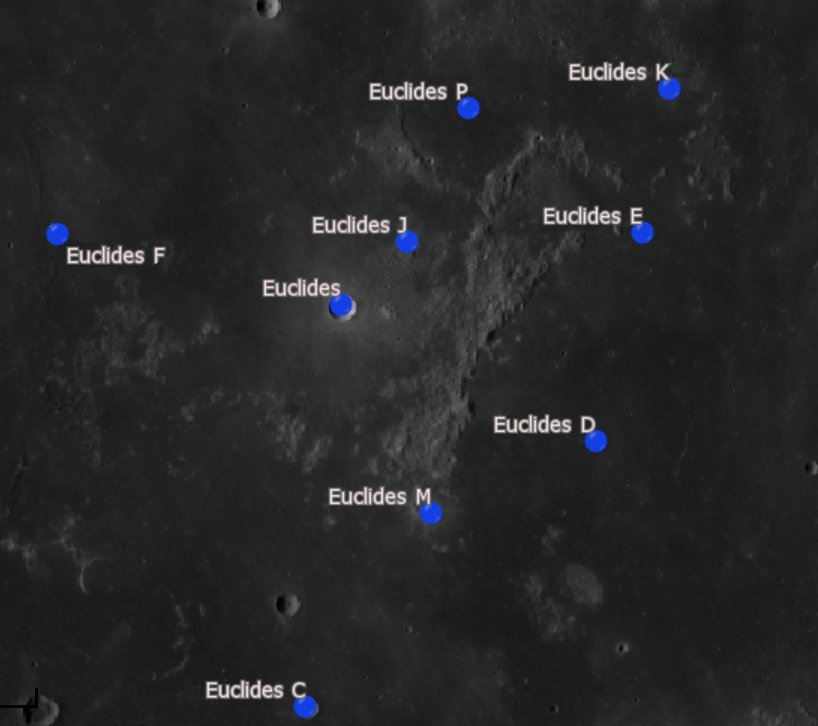
Euclides satellite formations and surroundings

By convention these features are identified on lunar maps by placing the letter on the side of the crater midpoint that is closest to Euclides.

Euclides	Latitude	Longitude	Diameter	Ref
C	13.2° S	30.0° W	10.14 km	WGPSN
D	9.4° S	25.7° W	5.78 km	WGPSN
E	6.3° S	25.1° W	3.53 km	WGPSN
F	6.3° S	33.7° W	5.39 km	WGPSN
J	6.4° S	28.5° W	3.4 km	WGPSN
K	4.2° S	24.7° W	6 km	WGPSN
M	10.4° S	28.2° W	5.79 km	WGPSN
P	4.5° S	27.6° W	63.82 km	WGPSN

The following crater has been renamed by the IAU.

- Euclides B — See Norman.

== Gallery ==
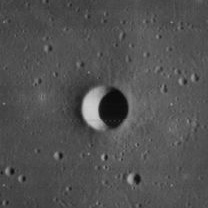
Lunar Orbiter 4 image of Euclides D

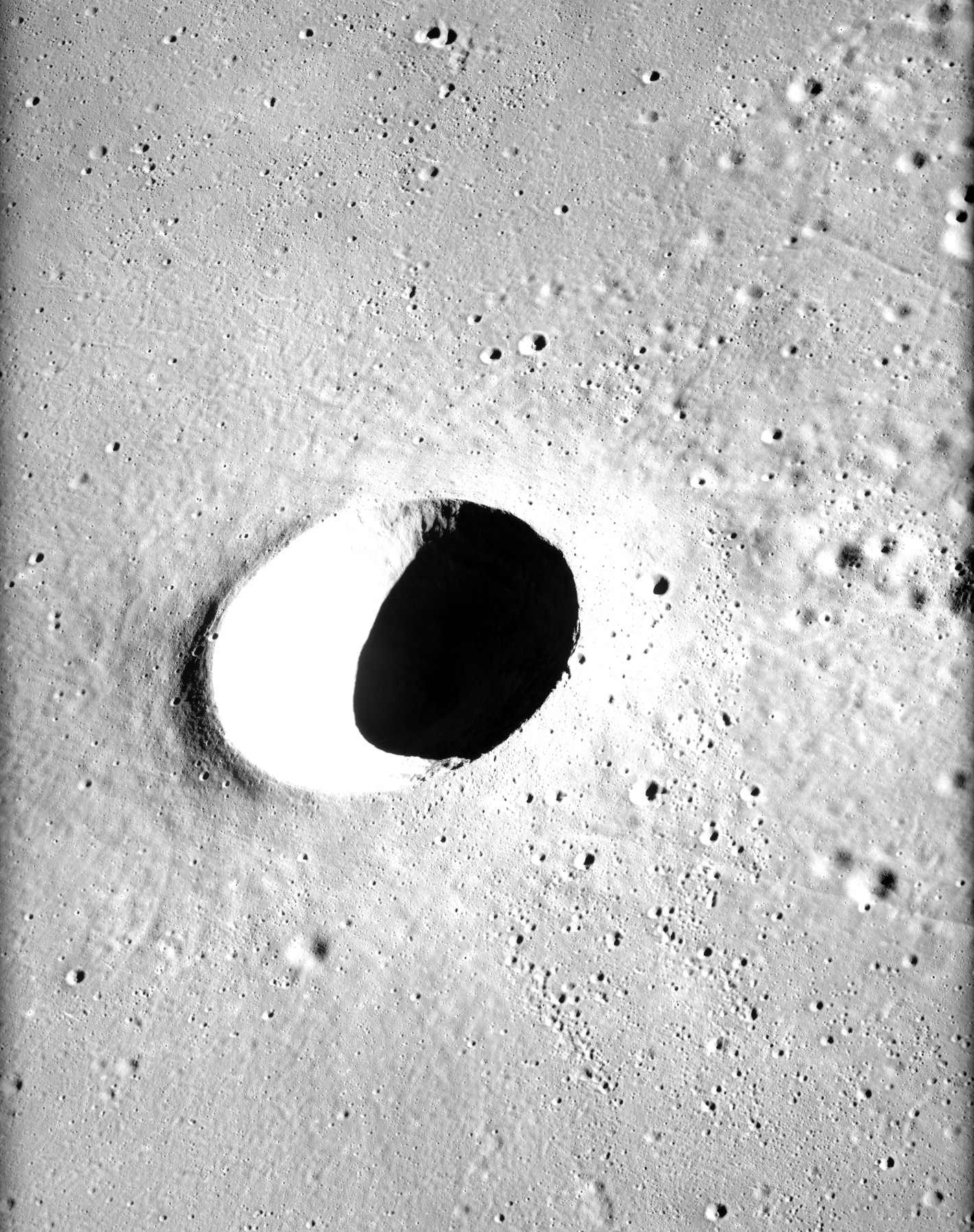
Oblique Panoramic Camera image of Euclides from Apollo 16

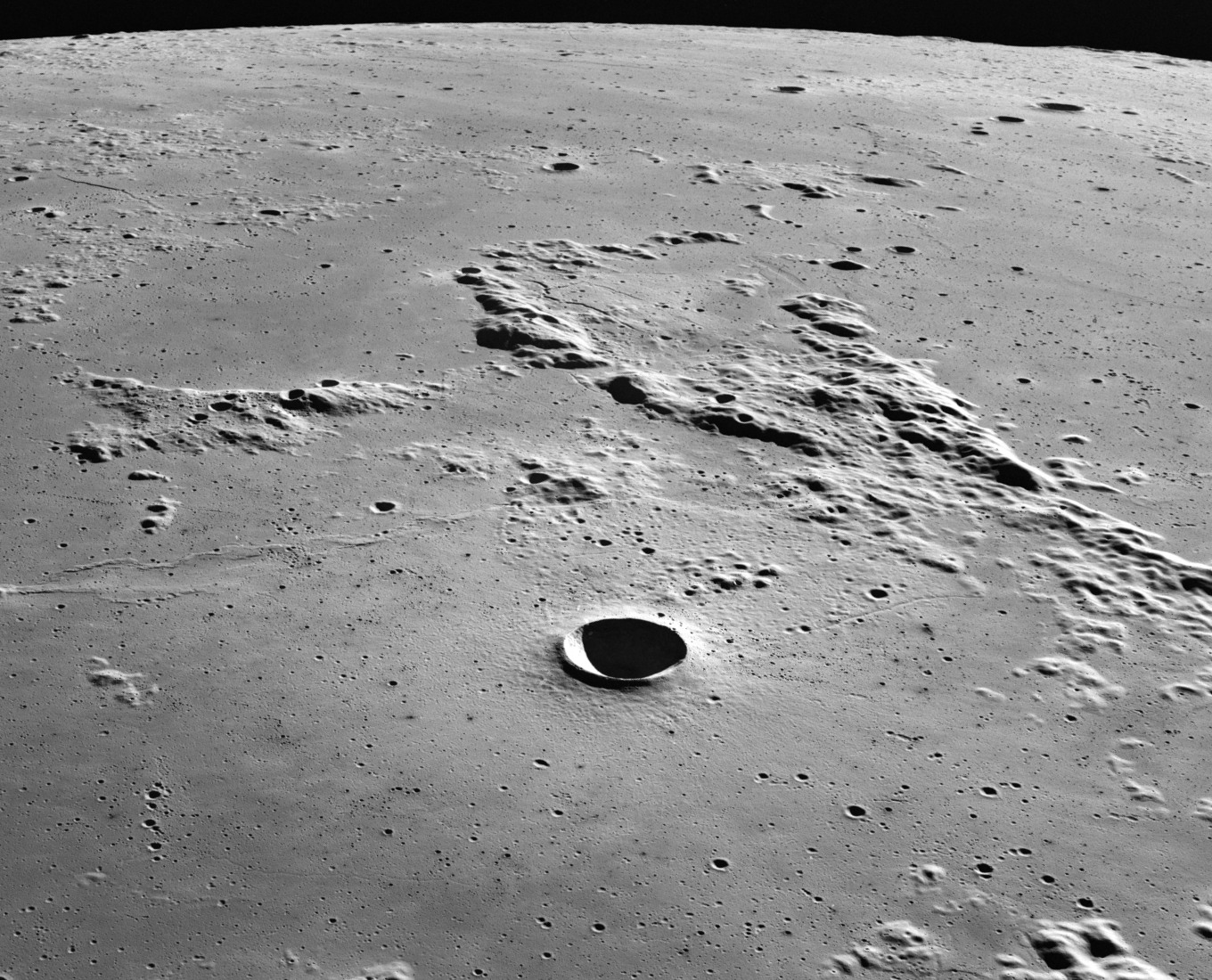
Oblique regional view also from Apollo 16

== See also ==
- Asteroid 4354 Euclides
