= Norman (crater) =

Crater on the Moon

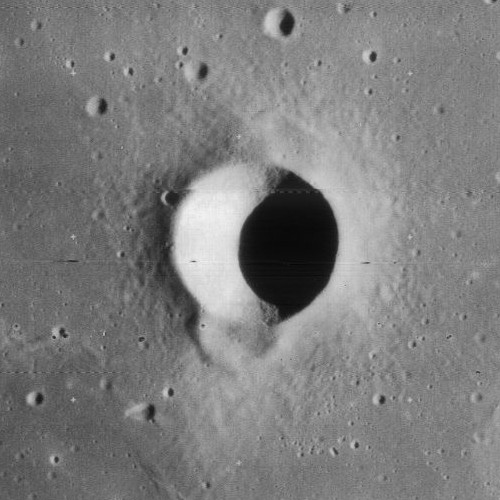
- Lunar Orbiter 4 image
- Coordinates: 11.8°S 30.4°W
- Diameter: 10 km
- Depth: 2.01 km (1.25 mi)
- Colongitude: 30° at sunrise
- Eponym: Robert Norman

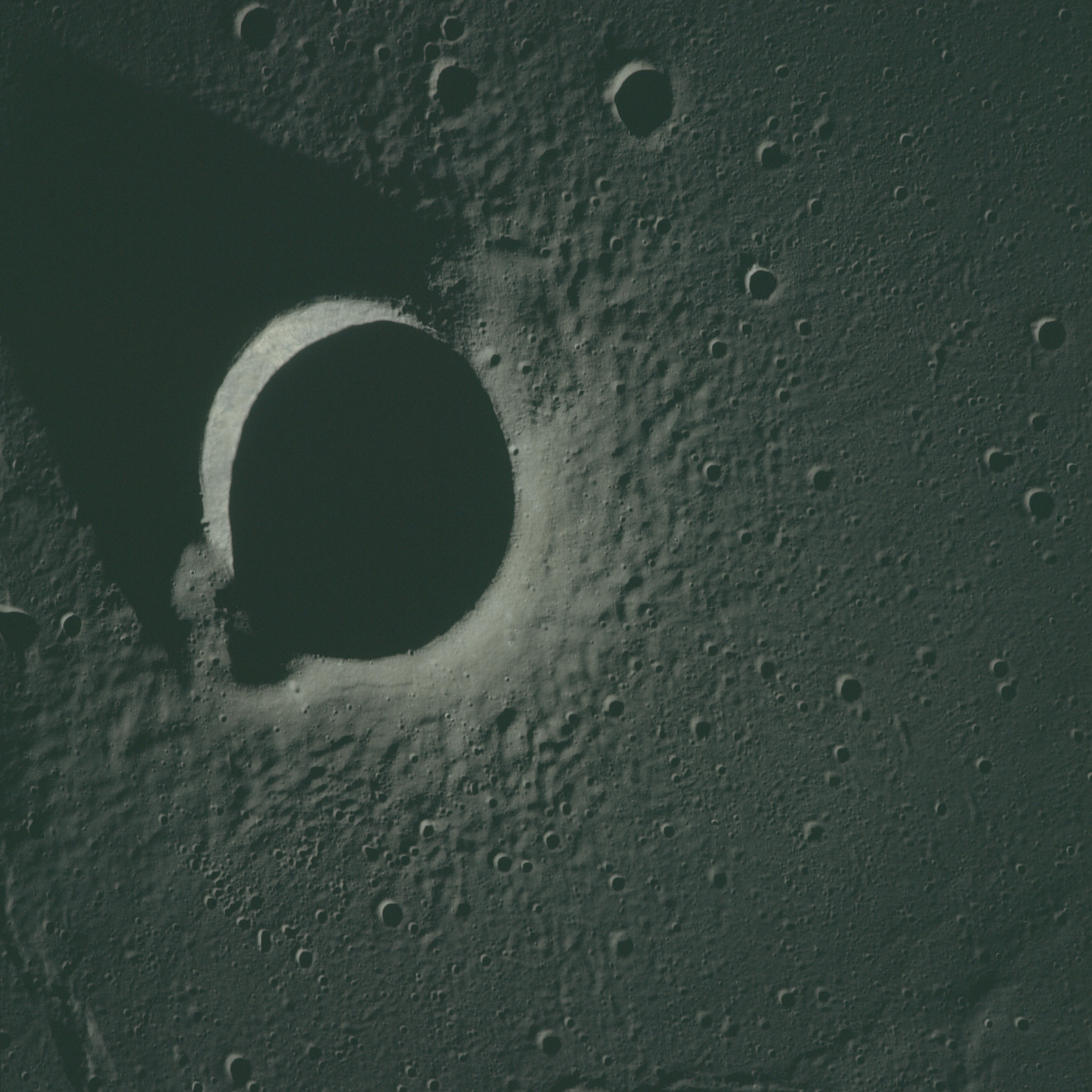
Oblique view from Apollo 16, at a low sun angle

Norman is a small lunar impact crater on the Oceanus Procellarum, to the south and slightly west of the crater Euclides. To the west-southwest is Herigonius. There are few other features of note in the vicinity, apart from some minor wrinkle ridges in the surface of the mare.

Norman is a circular, bowl-shaped formation with a small floor at the midpoint of the sloping inner walls. This feature was previously designated Euclides B prior to being renamed by the IAU.
