= Montes Riphaeus =

Mountain range on the Moon

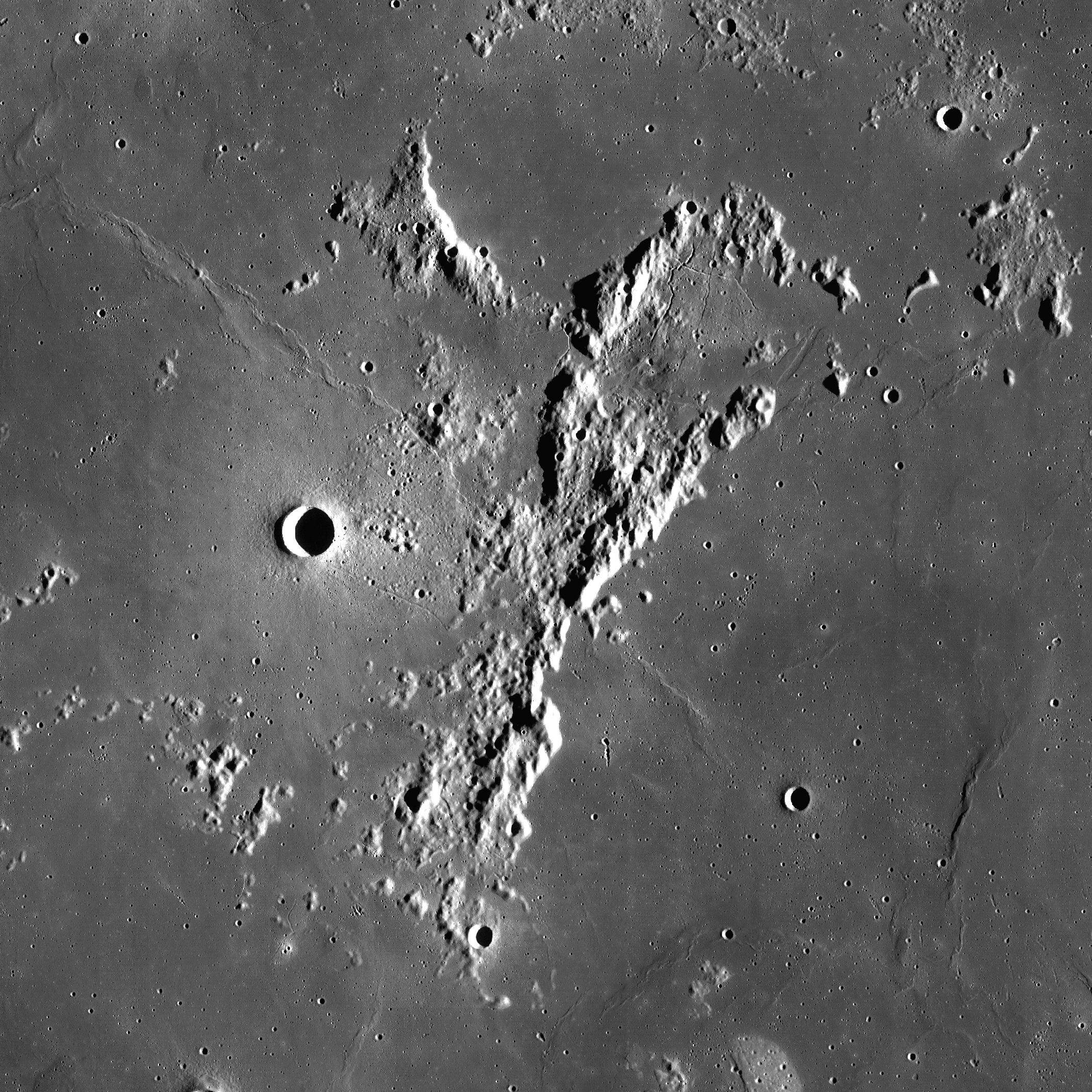
- LRO image

Highest point
- Listing: Lunar mountains
- Coordinates: 7.7°S 28.1°W

Geography
- Location: the Moon

Montes Riphaeus (Latin for "Riphaeus Mountains") is an irregular range of lunar mountains that lie along the west-northwestern edge of Mare Cognitum, on the southeastern edge of Oceanus Procellarum. The range trends generally from north-northeast to south-southwest. It includes a number of slender ridge lines with valleys flooded by intruding flows of lava.

This range is located at selenographic coordinates 7.7° S, 28.1° W. It has a diameter of 189 km (117 mi), although it is typically only about 30–50 km (19–31 mi) wide. The nearest feature of note is Euclides, a small but prominent crater to the west. About 100 km (62 mi) to the north is the crater Lansberg.

The range is named after the Riphean Mountains in the geography of classical antiquity. Johannes Hevelius was the first astronomer to apply the Riphean label to a feature of the lunar landscape, but Johann Heinrich von Mädler is responsible for the current designation of the Montes Riphaeus.

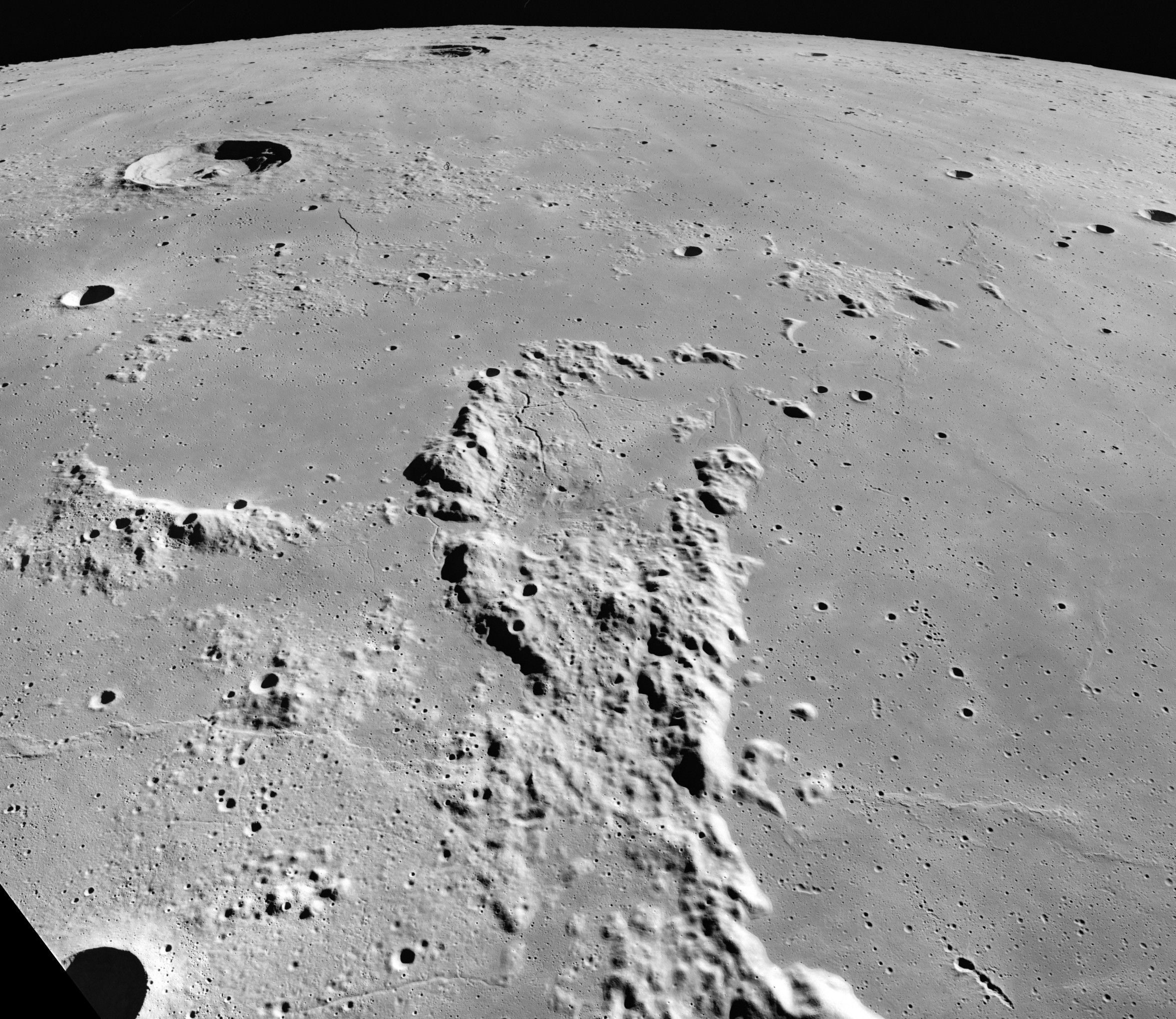
Mountains from Apollo 16

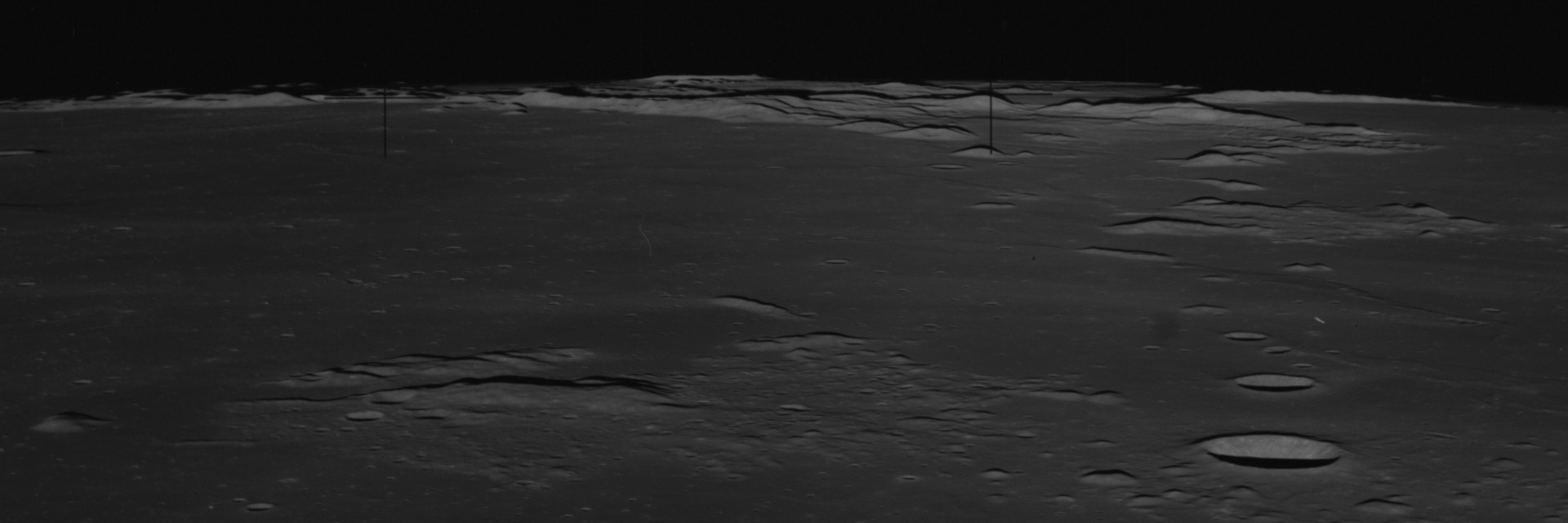
Montes Riphaeus at the horizon, facing west. From Apollo 14.

== See also ==
- List of Lunar mountains
