= Euclid's Phaenomena =

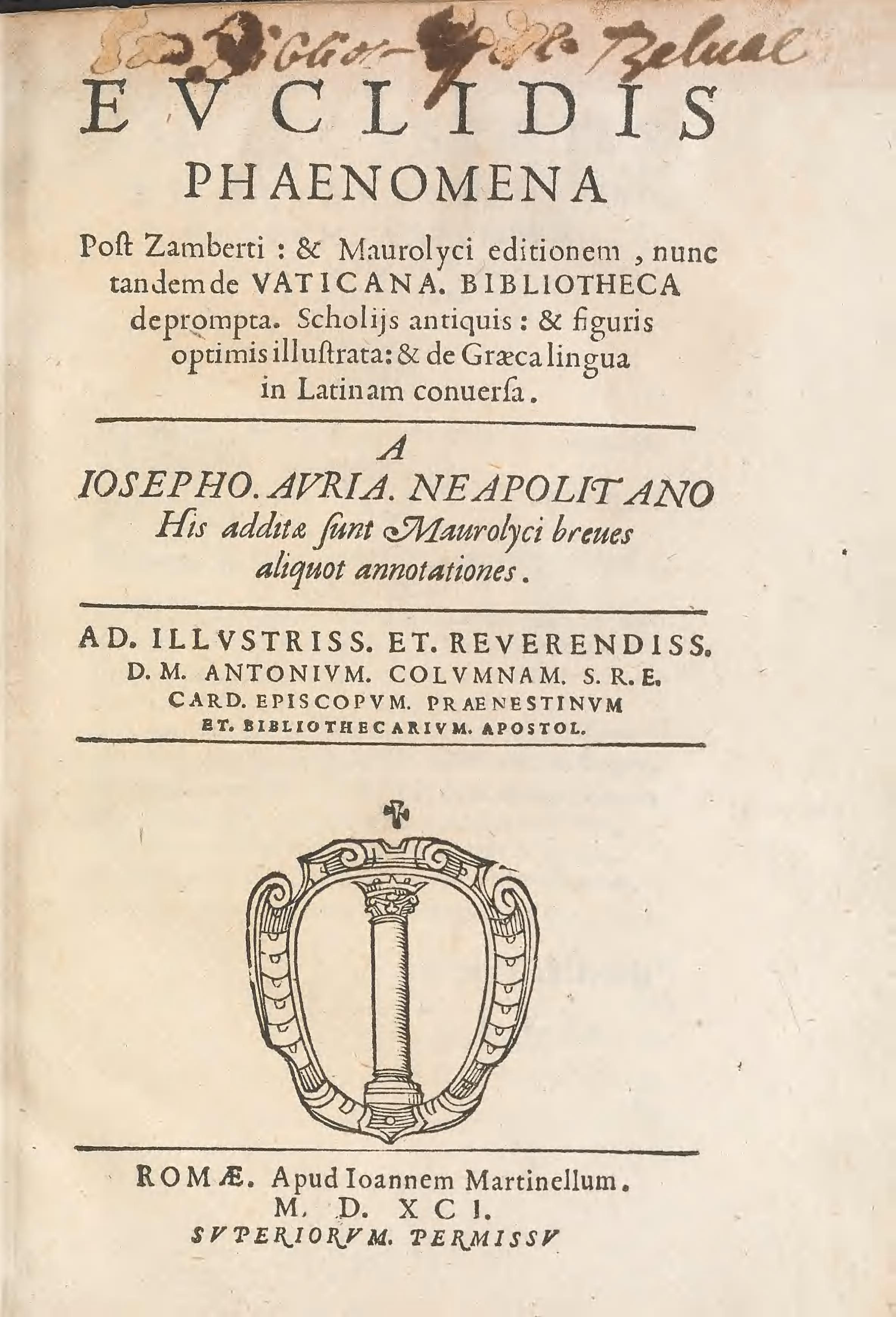
Euclidis Phaenomena, published in Romæ, 1591

Phaenomena is a work by Euclid on spherical astronomy. The book is divided into 18 propositions, each dealing with "the important arcs on the celestial sphere". The book was fully translated into English in 1996, authors used two surviving copies for translation.

== Translations ==
Latin

- Euclidis Phaenomena, published in Romæ, 1591

English

- Berggren, J. L.; Thomas, R. S. D. (2006). "Euclid's phaenomena: a translation and study of a hellenistic treatise in spherical astronomy" (PDF). Providence, RI: American Mathematical Society. ISBN 978-0-8218-4072-6.
