= Hans Eppinger =

Austrian physician (1879–1946

Eppinger

Hans Eppinger Jr. (5 January 1879, in Prague, Royal Bohemia, Austria-Hungary – 25 September 1946, in Vienna) was an Austrian physician of part-Jewish descent who performed experiments upon Nazi concentration camp prisoners.

== Early years ==
Hans Eppinger was born in Prague, the son of the physician Professor Hans Eppinger [Sr] [1848–1916], a son of Heinrich Eppinger (1813–1868), notary and chancellery director in the monastery of Braunau (Broumov) in Bohemia and his wife Aloisia Salomon. Hans Eppinger Sr married Georgine Zetter in Klagenfurt and had two daughters and a son, Hans Eppinger junior. Hans Eppinger Jr received an education in Graz and Strasbourg. In 1903, he became a medical doctor in Graz, working at a medical clinic. He moved to Vienna in 1908, and in 1909 he specialized in internal medicine, particularly conditions of the liver. He became a professor in 1918, then taught in Freiburg in 1926 and in Cologne in 1930.

In 1936 he is known to have travelled to Moscow to treat Joseph Stalin. A year later he was called to treat Queen Marie of Romania.

Eppinger had been a "member of the NSDAP in a leading position" since September 1937. In the weeks before the Anschluss, Eppinger's house served as a quarter for the "Nazi student cells" at the University of Vienna, no different from that of the Viennese professors Wilhelm Falta and Hans Spitzy. On 28 May he formally applied for admission to the NSDAP and was admitted retroactively to 1 May (membership number 6,164,614). His assistant and senior physicians were "almost without exception" SS and SA officers. When he learned that, contrary to his expectations, he was not intended to be chairman of the Internist Congress meeting in Vienna, he protested to the NSDAB.

== Experiments at Dachau ==
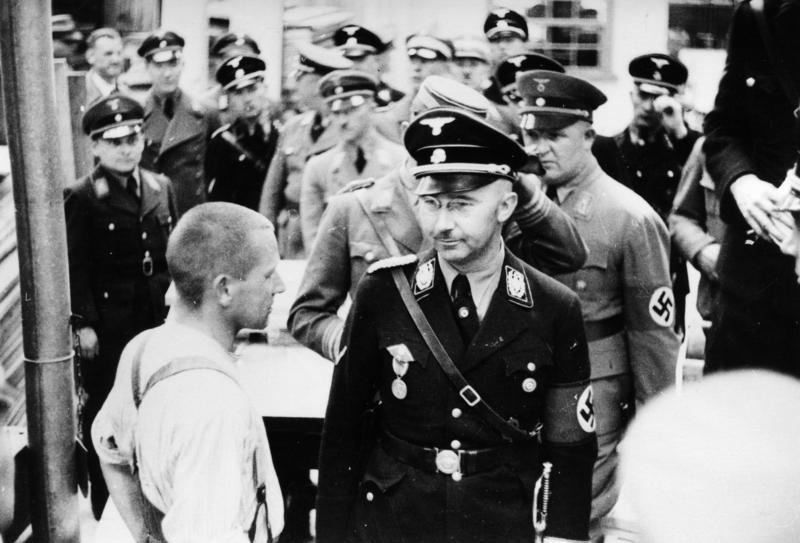
Heinrich Himmler (front right, beside prisoner) inspecting Dachau Concentration Camp on 8 May 1936.

As a result of his experiments on concentration camp prisoners at Dachau, he gained a notoriety during World War II. Along with professor Wilhelm Beiglböck, he performed tests on 90 Romani prisoners by providing them sea water as their only source of fluids. (In some cases the taste of the water was disguised to hide the saline content.) The prisoners suffered from severe dehydration, and witnesses reported that they had been seen licking the floors they had mopped in an attempt to hydrate themselves. The goal of the experiment was to determine if the prisoners would suffer severe physical symptoms or death within a period of 6–12 days.

== Capture and suicide ==
Eppinger, 67, committed suicide after the war, reportedly using poison. This occurred a month before he was to be called to testify at the Nuremberg Trials. Much later it was discovered that he had an unclaimed Swiss bank account.

== Eponymous medical terms ==
The following medical terms were named after Eppinger:

- Cauchois-Eppinger-Frugoni syndrome (renamed to portal vein thrombosis)
- Eppinger's spider naevus (Spider Angioma)

From 1973, the Falk Foundation of Freiburg awarded an Eppinger Prize for outstanding contributions to liver research. However, when Eppinger's activities at Dachau were brought to public attention in 1984, the prize was cancelled.

In 1976, the lunar crater Euclides D was renamed by the IAU to honor Hans Eppinger. However, after Eppinger's association with Nazi prison camps was brought to the attention of the Working Group for Planetary System Nomenclature by the Lunar Republic Society in 2002, the name was dropped. As of July 2009, the crater is once again officially listed as Euclides D.

== See also ==
- List of medical eponyms with Nazi associations
