= Antonio Barbalonga =

Italian painter

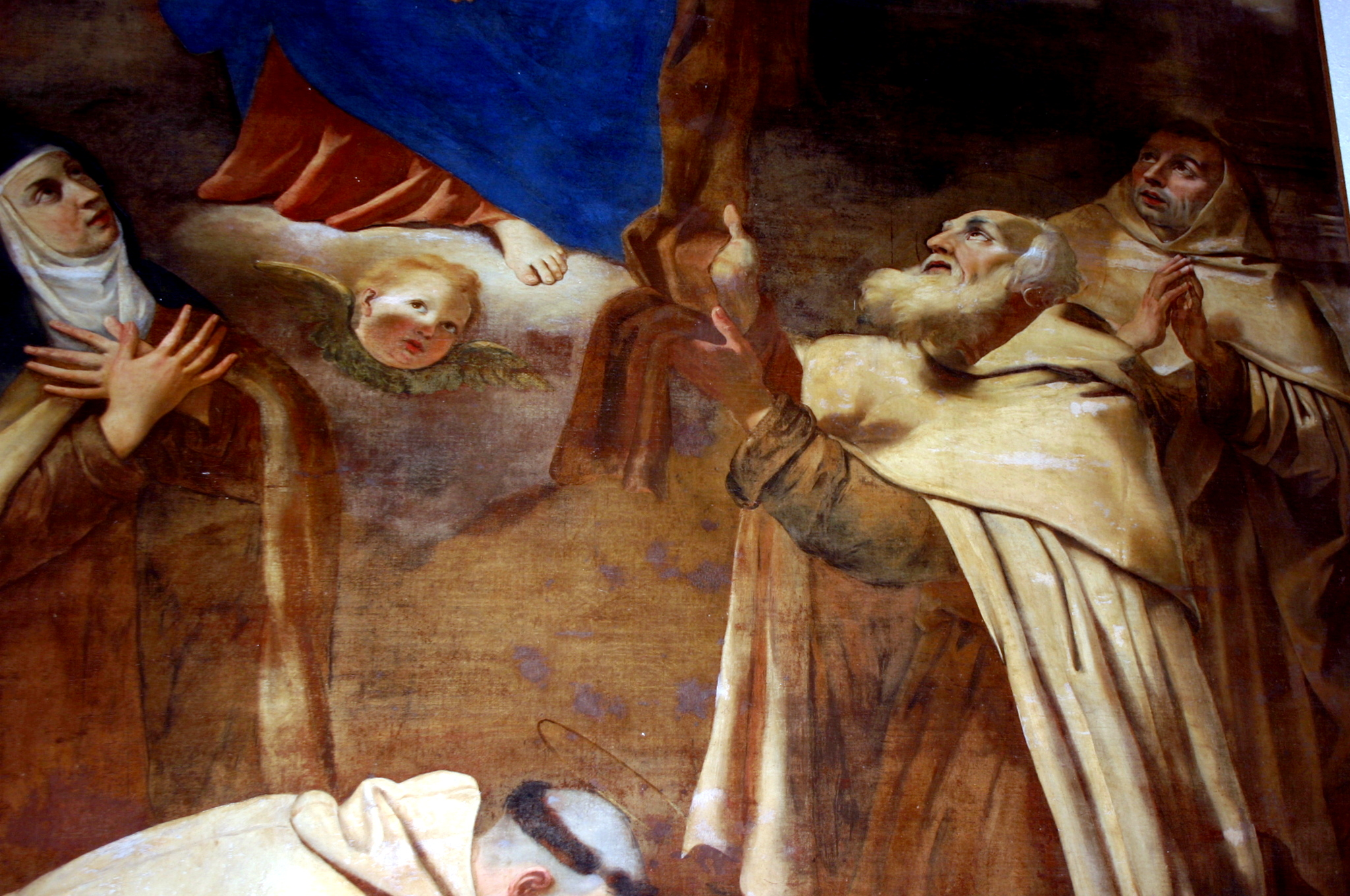
Madonna and Carmelite saints by Antonio Barbalonga

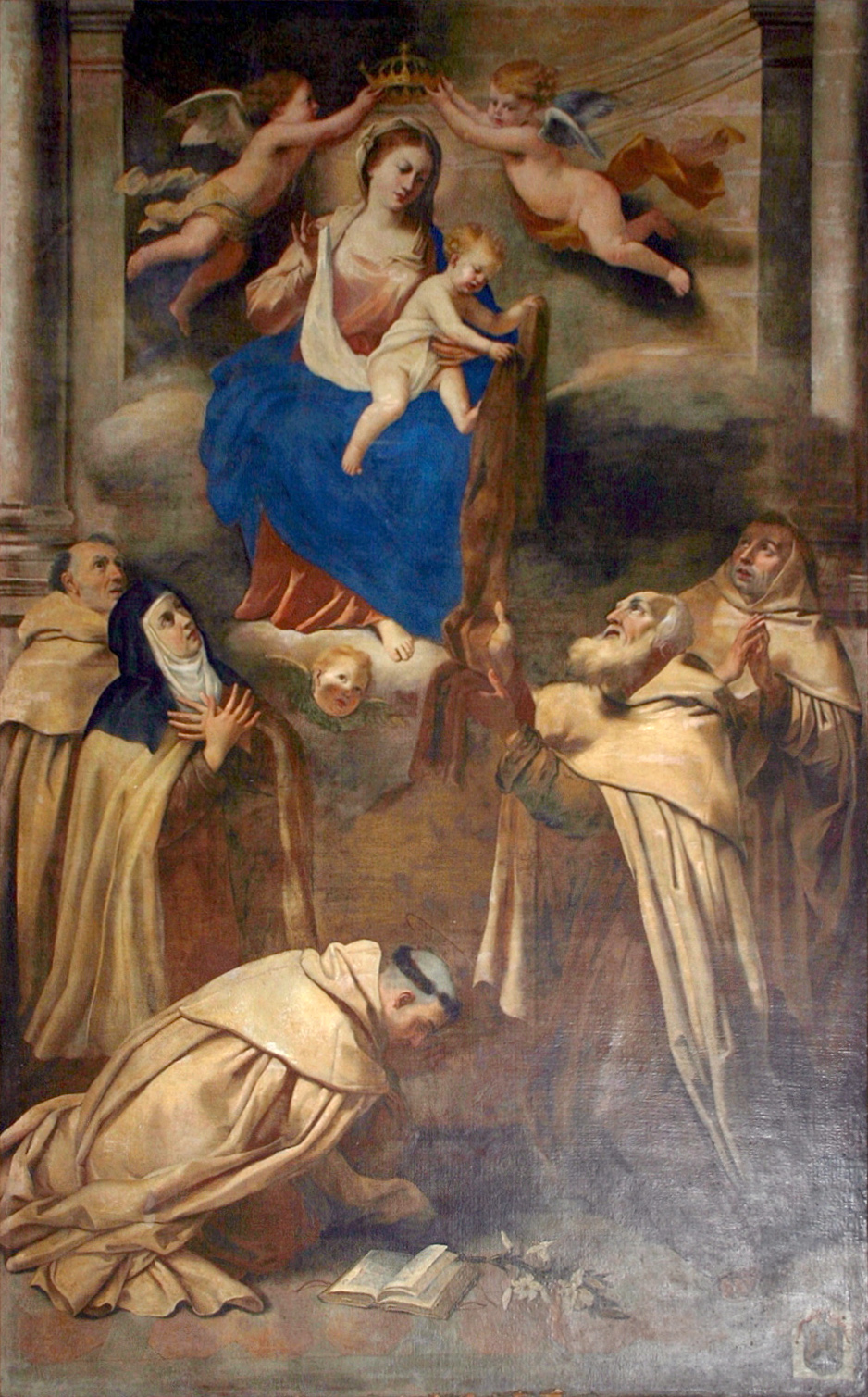
Antonio Alberti, Madonna and Carmelite saints, in the Santa Caterina d'Alessandria church in Taormina, Italy

Antonio Barbalonga or Barbalunga (1600 – 2 November 1649), also called Antonio Alberti, was an Italian painter of the Baroque period.

He was a member of the noble family of the Alberti, born at Messina, and was there instructed in painting by Simone Comandé. He went to Rome, where he became a pupil of Domenichino, whose style he imitated with great skill.

Barbalonga executed a great number of paintings for churches, his chief work being the Conversion of St. Paul for the convent church of St. Anna at Messina. He painted in Rome for both the Church of the Theatines (San Silvestro al Quirinale) for the church of Sant' Andrea della Valle, and for the church of San Silvestro in Capite in Rome. In Messina, he painted a St. Gregory for the church of San Gregorio, and an Assumption for the S. Michèle in Messina.

Other works exist in Rome, Palermo, and Madrid. He died at Messina. Domenico Maroli was one of his pupils.
