= 4354 Euclides =

Main-belt asteroid

Discovery
- Discovered by: C. J. van Houten; I. van Houten-G. T. Gehrels
- Discovery site: Palomar Obs.
- Discovery date: 24 September 1960

Designations
- Pronunciation: /juːˈklaɪdiːz/
- Named after: Euclid (Εὐκλείδης Eukleidēs) (Greek mathematician)
- Alternative designations: 2142 P-L · 1971 BL_{2} 1979 YO_{6} · 1983 RF
- Minor planet category: main-belt · (middle); Dora

Orbital characteristics
- Epoch 23 March 2018 (JD 2458200.5)
- Uncertainty parameter 0
- Observation arc: 63.66 yr (23,250 d)
- Aphelion: 3.3787 AU
- Perihelion: 2.2128 AU
- Semi-major axis: 2.7957 AU
- Eccentricity: 0.2085
- Orbital period (sidereal): 4.67 yr (1,707 d)
- Mean anomaly: 62.073°
- Mean motion: 0° 12^{m} 38.88^{s} / day
- Inclination: 7.4252°
- Longitude of ascending node: 192.98°
- Argument of perihelion: 242.62°

Physical characteristics
- Mean diameter: 12.339±0.282 km
- Geometric albedo: 0.051±0.005
- Spectral type: C (est. Dora family)
- Absolute magnitude (H): 13.5

4354 Euclides /juːˈklaɪdiːz/, provisional designation 2142 P-L, is a dark Dorian asteroid from the central regions of the asteroid belt, approximately 12 kilometers (7 miles) in diameter. It was discovered on 24 September 1960, by Dutch astronomer couple Ingrid and Cornelis van Houten on photographic plates taken by Dutch–American astronomer Tom Gehrels at Palomar Observatory in California. The likely C-type asteroid was named after the Greek mathematician Euclid.

== Orbit and classification ==
Euclides is a core member of the Dora family (512), a well-established central asteroid family of more than 1,200 carbonaceous asteroids. The family's namesake is 668 Dora. It is alternatively known as the "Zhongolovich family", named after its presumably largest member 1734 Zhongolovich. The Dora family may also contain a subfamily.

It orbits the Sun in the central asteroid belt at a distance of 2.2–3.4 AU once every 4 years and 8 months (1,707 days; semi-major axis of 2.8 AU). Its orbit has an eccentricity of 0.21 and an inclination of 7° with respect to the ecliptic. The body's observation arc begins with a precovery taken at Palomar in July 1954, or six years prior to its official discovery observation.

=== Palomar–Leiden survey ===
The survey designation "P-L" stands for Palomar–Leiden, named after Palomar Observatory and Leiden Observatory, which collaborated on the fruitful Palomar–Leiden survey in the 1960s. Gehrels used Palomar's Samuel Oschin telescope (also known as the 48-inch Schmidt Telescope), and shipped the photographic plates to Ingrid and Cornelis van Houten at Leiden Observatory where astrometry was carried out. The trio are credited with the discovery of several thousand asteroid discoveries.

== Physical characteristics ==
Although the asteroids spectral type has not been determined, it is likely a common, carbonaceous C-type asteroid, as Euclides belongs to the Dora family. As of 2018, no rotational lightcurve of Euclides has been obtained from photometric observations. The body's rotation period, pole and shape remain unknown.

=== Diameter and albedo ===
According to the survey carried out by the NEOWISE mission of NASA's Wide-field Infrared Survey Explorer, Euclides measures 12.339 kilometers in diameter and its surface has an albedo of 0.051, typical for a carbonaceous asteroid.

== Naming ==
This minor planet was named after the Greek mathematician and Euclid (also: Euclides, or Eukleides). The "father of geometry" lived in Alexandria about 300 B.C. The official naming citation was published by the Minor Planet Center on 8 July 1990 (M.P.C. 16594). The lunar crater Euclides was also named in his honor.
