= Domenico Maroli =

Italian painter (1612–1676)

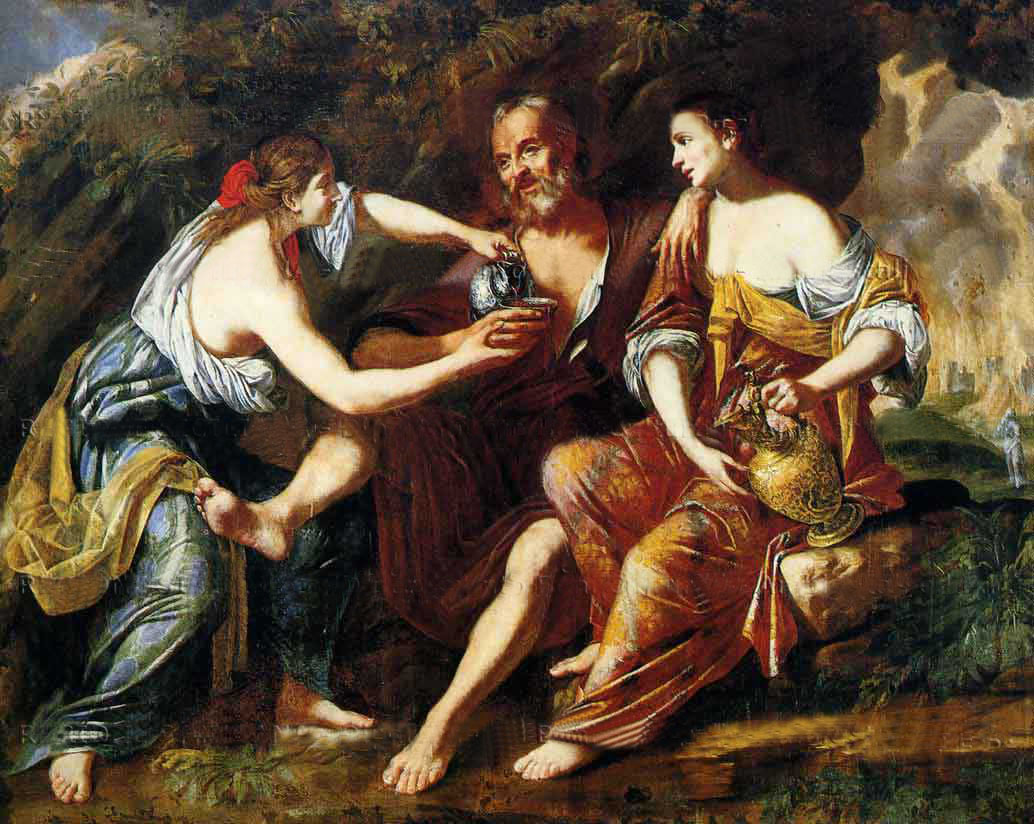

Domenico Maroli (1612 – May 23, 1676) was an Italian Baroque painter, active in Sicily and Venice.

== Biography ==
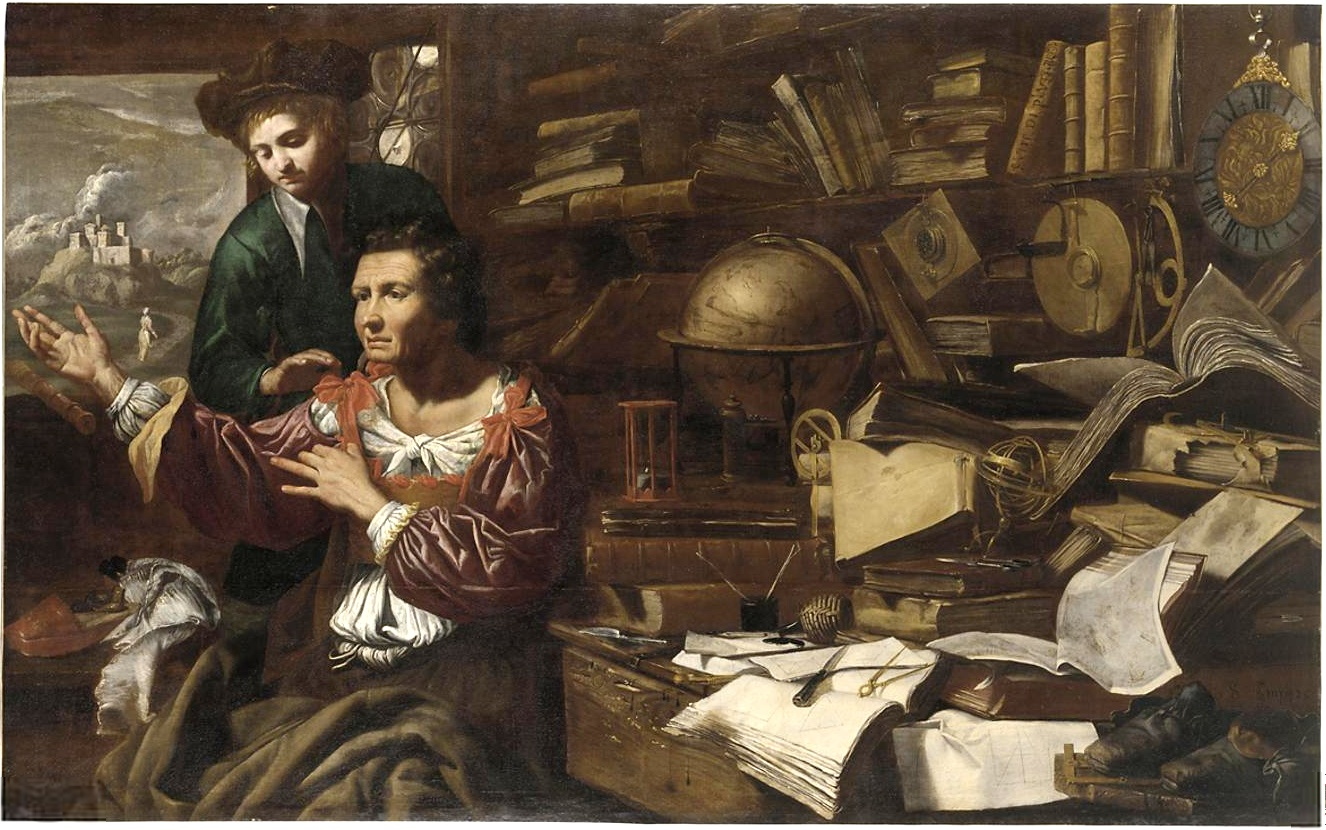
Euclid of Megara Dressing as a Woman to Hear Socrates Teach in Athens c. 1650

He trained in his native Messina, Sicily, beginning at the age of 22 years under Antonio Barbalonga. In 1642, he traveled to Venice. He befriended the painter and art merchant Marco Boschini (1613–1678), who described Maroli as a painter of pastoral subjects, a second Jacopo Bassano. By the late 1650s, he had returned to Messina by way of Bologna. Few paintings of his are confirmed; some have been destroyed in earthquakes. Among his religious subjects are Loth and her daughters and the Ecstasy of St Peter of Alcantara A large genre-historic canvas depicting Euclid of Megara Dressing as a Woman to Hear Socrates Teach in Athens has been attributed to Maroli's stay in Venice. Among the works attributed to him was a painting of storm-tossed naked maidens that was judged by some to be licentious.

He is said to have been involved in the Revolutions of 1674-1676
