= Riphean Mountains =

Mountains mentioned by authors of classical antiquity

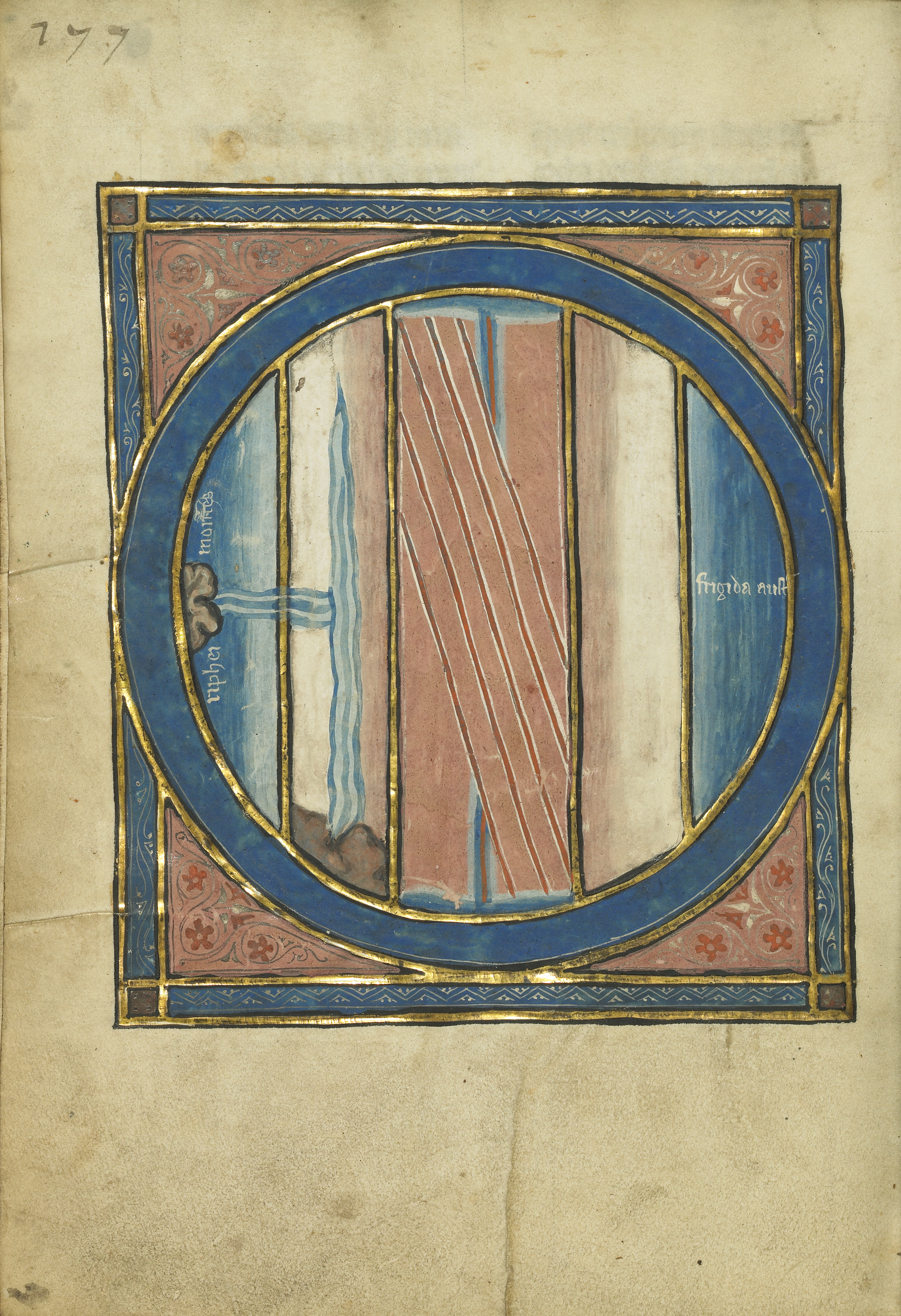
Franco-Flemish map of the world (ca. 1277) depicting global climate zones. The Riphean Mountains (riphei montes) appear in the far north (left).

In Greco-Roman geography, the Riphean Mountains (also Riphaean; /rɪˈfiən/; Ancient Greek: Ῥιπαῖα ὄρη; Latin: Rhipaei or Riphaei montes) were a supposed mountain range located in the far north of Eurasia. The name of the mountains is probably derived from Ancient Greek: ῥιπή ("wind gust"). The Ripheans were often considered the northern boundary of the known world. As such, classical and medieval writers described them as extremely cold and covered in perennial snow. Ancient geographers considered the Ripheans the source of Boreas (the north wind) and several large rivers (the Dnieper, the Don, and the Volga). The location of the Ripheans, as described by most classical geographers, would correspond roughly with the Volga region of modern-day Russia.

Greeks initially used the term Hyperborei Montes to denote a mythical mountain range in the far north, associated with the legendary land of Hyperborea, but later ancient geographers applied it to actual mountain ranges, including the Caucasus, the Ural Mountains and the Rhipaei Montes.

== History ==
Early references to the Ripheans appear in the writings of the Greek choral poet Alcman (7th century BC) and the Athenian playwright Sophocles (5th century BC). Many other ancient Hellenic writers mentioned the Ripheans, including Aristotle, Hippocrates, Callimachus, Apollonius of Rhodes, and Claudius Ptolemy. Ancient Roman writers also described the Ripheans in Latin literature: Plutarch, Vergil, and Pliny the Elder, among others. Late antique and early medieval writers, like Solinus, Martianus Capella, Orosius, and Isidore of Seville, ensured the Ripheans' continued place in geographic writing during the Middle Ages. These writers often disagreed on the exact location of the mountains, and a small minority of geographers (e.g. Strabo) doubted their existence entirely. In antiquity, the inhabitants of the mountains were variously called Ripheans (e.g. Pomponius Mela) or Arimaspi (e.g. Pliny). Geographers sometimes located the home of the legendary Hyperboreans in the inaccessible regions north of the Ripheans. While the Riphean Mountains appear only in Greek or Greek-influenced geographies, the name of the mountains has sometimes been connected by Christian theologians with Riphath, son of Gomer in Genesis 10. The Book of Jubilees (8:12, 16, 28) also mentions a mountain range called Rafa, which some have cautiously linked to the Ripheans.

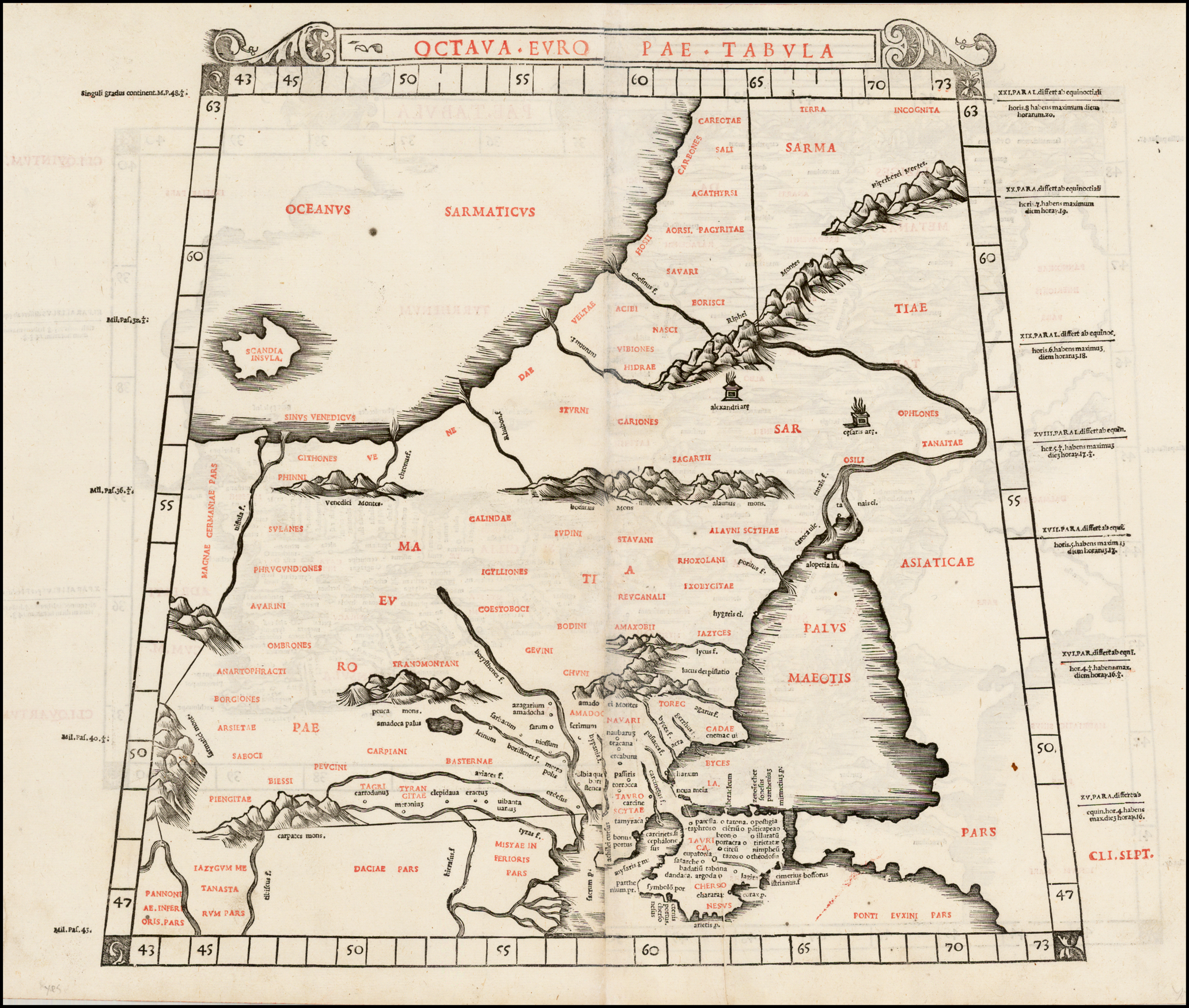
A Renaissance map of Eastern Europe, according to Ptolemy's Geographia. The Riphean (and "Hyperborean") Mountains appear in the upper right. Bernardo Silvano (Venice, 1511).

In late 15th-century western Europe, new access to Claudius Ptolemy's Geography led to many new maps of "Sarmatia," which notably featured the Riphean Mountains. In tandem with new contacts with the Grand Duchy of Moscow, Renaissance humanists and ambassadors debated the existence of the Riphean Mountains in the first half of the sixteenth century. Some, like Maciej Miechowita and Paolo Giovio, argued that the mountains were non-existent. Others, like the ambassadors Francesco Da Collo and Sigismund von Herberstein, argued that the ancient Ripheans referred to the Ural Mountains, then recently explored by Muscovy. Over the course of the sixteenth century, the Ripheans gradually disappeared from western maps of eastern Europe, along with many other ancient claims about the region.

While people since the 16th century have tended to connect the Ripheans to the Ural Mountains, the original identity of the classical Ripheans remains unclear. The Alps, the Carpathians, and the Urals have all been suggested as the real-world inspiration for the Riphean Mountains.

== Namesakes ==
The Montes Riphaeus mountain range on the Moon is named after the Riphean Mountains. Johannes Hevelius was the first astronomer to apply the Riphean label to a feature of the lunar landscape, but Johann Heinrich von Mädler is responsible for the current designation of the Montes Riphaeus.

The Riphean geochronological period was also named after the Riphean Mountains, in reference to the Ural Mountains.

== See also ==
- Mountains of the Moon (Africa)
- Mountains of Kong
