= Mare Cognitum =

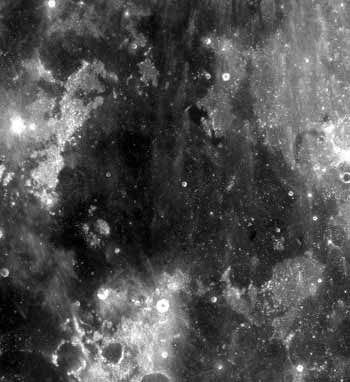
- Mare Cognitum. Fra Mauro is the gray region in the upper right.
- Coordinates: 10.5°S 22.3°W
- Diameter: 350 kilometers (220 mi)
- Eponym: Sea That Has Become Known, or Known Sea

Mare Cognitum /ˈkɒɡnɪtəm/ (Latin cognitum, the "Sea that has Become Known") is a lunar mare located in a basin or large crater which sits in the second ring of Oceanus Procellarum. To the northwest of the mare is the Montes Riphaeus mountain range, part of the rim of the buried crater or basin containing the mare. Previously unnamed, the mare received its name in 1964 in reference to its selection as the target for the successful impact probe Ranger 7, the first American spacecraft to return closeup images of the Moon's surface.

== Origin ==
The basin material is of the Pre-Nectarian epoch, while most of the basaltic mare material is of the Upper Imbrian epoch.

== Exploration ==
The Ranger 7 lunar probe impacted Mare Cognitum at the conclusion of its picture-taking mission. Surveyor 3 and Apollo 12 landed near its northern shore. The outcrop of the Fra Mauro formation, where Apollo 14 landed, is also located near Mare Cognitum.

=== Statio Cognitum ===
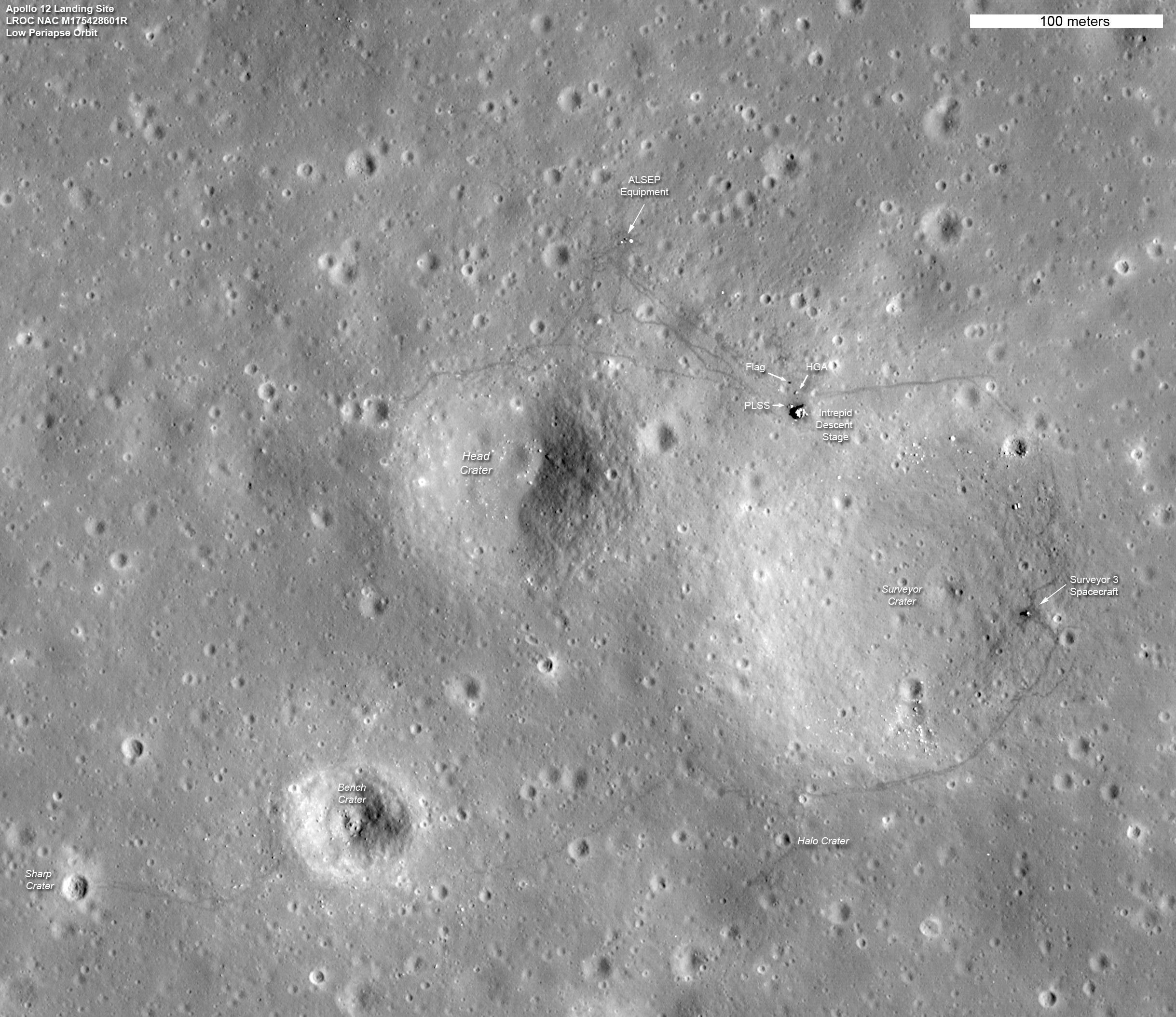
Aerial view of Statio Cognitum; the Lunar Module descent stage of Apollo 12, Surveyor 3, and other equipment and local craters are labeled (click to enlarge). The astronauts' footprints are still visible.

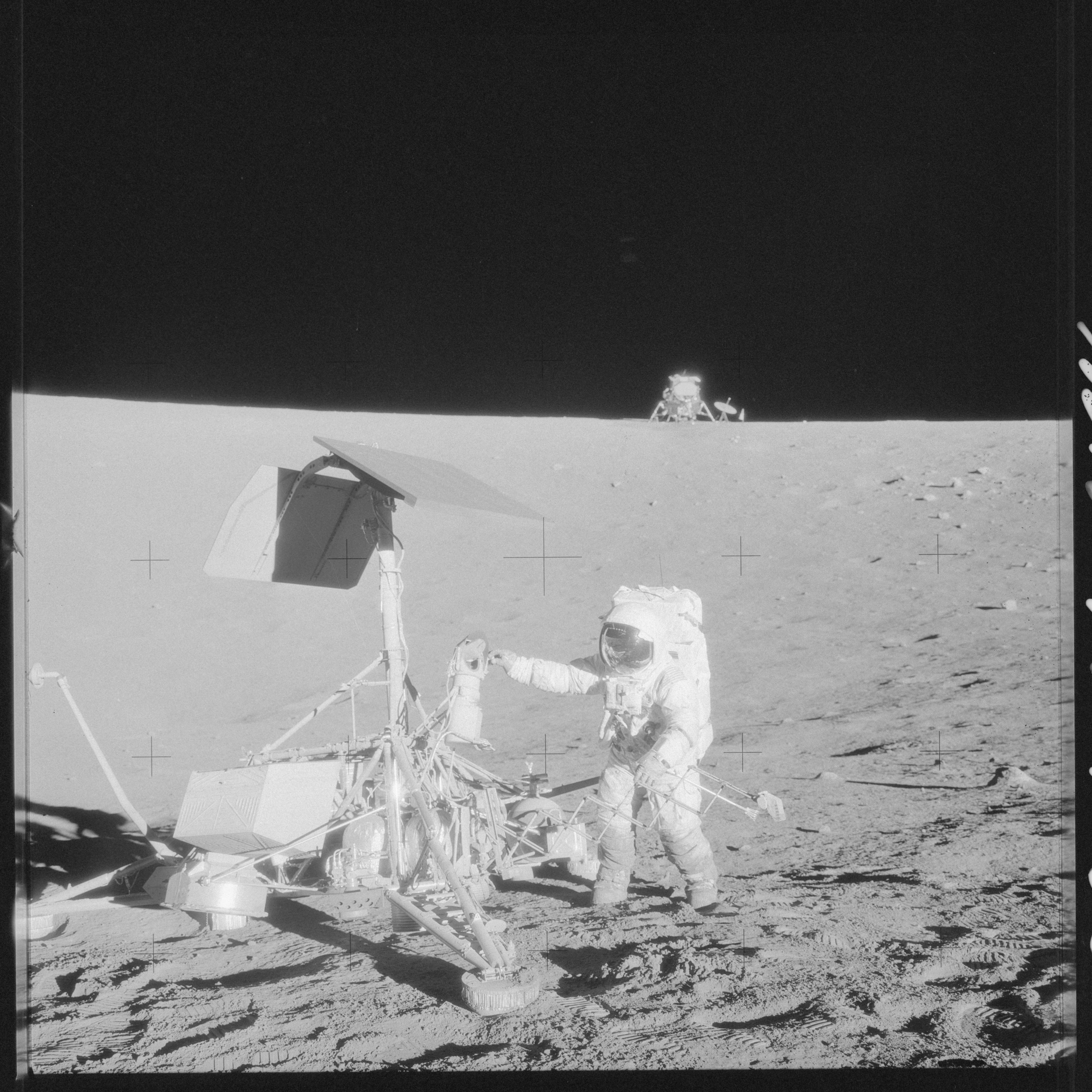
Statio Cognitum lunar base of Surveyor 3 and Apollo 12, with astronaut Pete Conrad and the Intrepid lander and S-band antenna in the background, in a first ever visit of a separate mission beyond Low Earth Orbit

On November 19, 1969, astronauts Pete Conrad and Alan Bean landed Apollo 12's Lunar Module within walking distance of Surveyor 3, which had been on the Moon since 1967. Named "Statio Cognitum" the site's closeness to its intended target demonstrated NASA's capability of precise lunar landings. The location also provided a relatively smooth Mare surface and a proximity to the lunar equator, thus ensuring relative ease of access from the standpoint of fuel consumption.

Geologically, the astronauts noted the amount of glass contained in the regolith and present at the bottoms of shallow craters at the site, as well as lighter-colored regolith material that geologists later determined to be ejecta from Copernicus crater. The Copernicus ejecta sampled suggested that the Copernicus impact occurred about 800 million years ago, but geologists believe the results of this analysis are inconclusive. The Apollo 12 astronauts also noted the existence of small, shallow elongated depressions ("trenches" or "grooves") similar to those the Apollo 11 astronauts observed at Tranquility Base in the Sea of Tranquility; Shoemaker et al. preliminarily concluded in 1970 that these features reflected the direction and location of fractures in the underlying bedrock, into which fine-grained material settled, thereby creating the grooves.

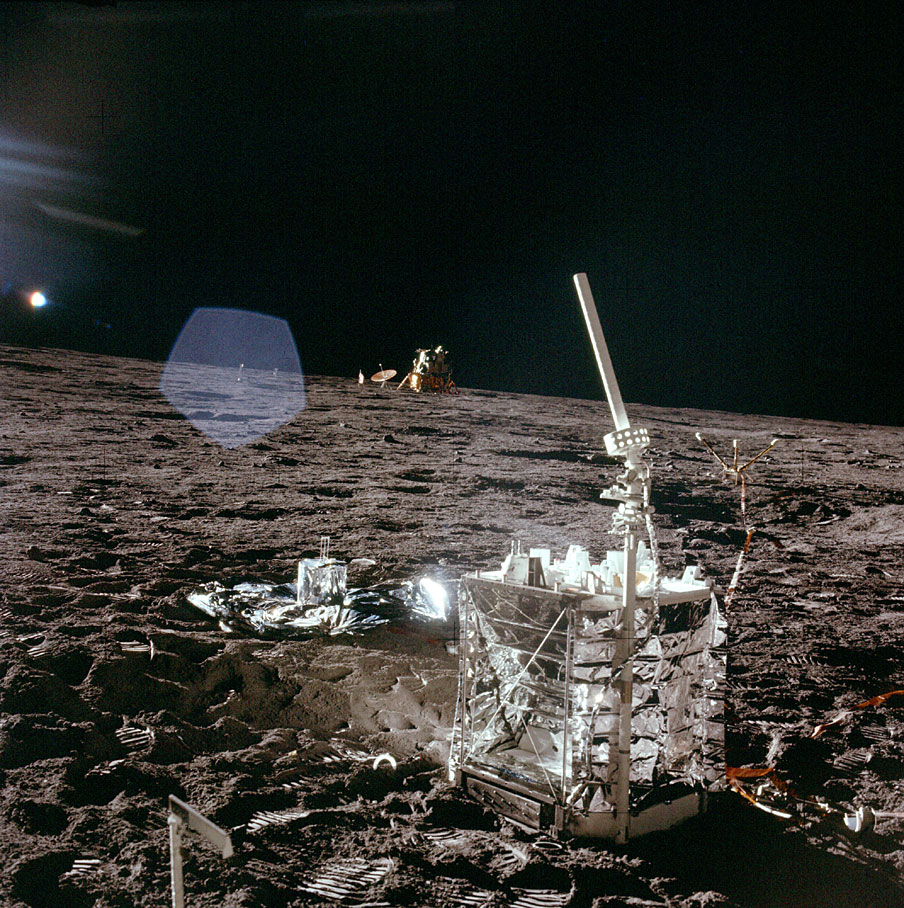
Apollo 12 Apollo Lunar Surface Experiments Package (ALSEP), with the Intrepid lander and the S-band High Gain Antenna in the background

Overall, Statio Cognitum and the surrounding area appears to have a slightly more red coloration from lunar orbit than Tranquility Base (which geologists later found to be the result of less titanium in the Apollo 12 rocks) and to have fewer craters overall than Tranquility Base; because of this, geologists suspected the site chosen for Apollo 12 contained younger rocks than those of the Apollo 11 site, and this was confirmed by the samples returned by Apollo 12. These samples consisted of more basalts and fewer breccias than the Apollo 11 samples and the basalts are about 500 million years younger than those from Tranquility base, the latter of which geologists estimate to be about 3.6 to 3.8 billion years old. The differing ages of the basalts collected on Apollo 11 and Apollo 12 demonstrate that the volcanic activity that formed the lunar mare did not occur all at once across the lunar surface, but rather took place at different times at different locations.

== See also ==
- Volcanism on the Moon
