= List of medieval European scientists =

Scientific activity in medieval Europe was maintained by the activity of a number of significant scholars, active in a wide range of scientific disciplines and working in Greek, Latin, and Arabic-speaking cultures. This list provides a brief summary of their work.

== Early Middle Ages ==
Anatolius of Laodicea (early 3rd century – 283), a bishop of Laodicea, one of the foremost scholars of his day in the physical sciences.

Nemesius (?-c. 390), a bishop of Emesa whose De Natura Hominis blended theology with Galenic medicine and is notable for his ideas concerning the brain. He also may have anticipated the discovery of the circulatory system.

Isidore of Miletus (ca. 442 – ca. 537) was a renowned Byzantine scientist and mathematician. He was one of the two main Byzantine Greek architects (Anthemius of Tralles was the other) that Emperor Justinian I commissioned to design the cathedral Hagia Sophia in Constantinople from 532 to 537. He taught stereometry and physics at the universities, first of Alexandria then of Constantinople, and wrote a commentary on an older treatise on vaulting. Isidore is also renowned for producing the first comprehensive compilation of Archimedes' work, the Archimedes palimpsest.

Anthemius of Tralles (ca. 474 – ca. 534), a Byzantine professor of geometry and architecture, authored many influential works on mathematics and was one of the architects of the famed Hagia Sophia, the largest building in the world at its time. His works were among the most important source texts in the Arab world and Western Europe for centuries after.

John Philoponus (ca. 490–ca. 570), also known as John the Grammarian, a Christian Byzantine philosopher, launched a revolution in the understanding of physics by critiquing and correcting the earlier works of Aristotle. In the process he proposed important concepts such as a rudimentary notion of inertia and the invariant acceleration of falling objects. Although his works were repressed at various times in the Byzantine Empire, because of religious controversy, they would nevertheless become important to the understanding of physics throughout Europe and the Arab world.

Paul of Aegina (ca. 625–ca. 690), considered by some to be the greatest Christian Byzantine surgeon, developed many novel surgical techniques and authored the medical encyclopedia Medical Compendium in Seven Books. The book on surgery in particular was the definitive treatise in Europe and the Islamic world for hundreds of years.

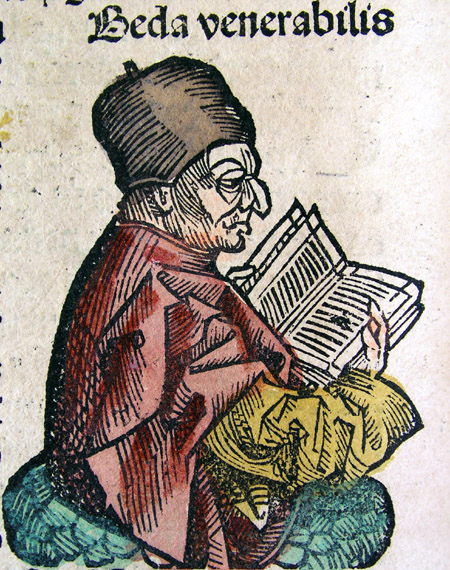
The Venerable Bede

The Venerable Bede (ca. 672–735), a Christian monk of the monasteries of Wearmouth and Jarrow who wrote a work On the Nature of Things, several books on the mathematical / astronomical subject of computus, the most influential entitled On the Reckoning of Time. He made original discoveries concerning the nature of the tides and his works on computus became required elements of the training of clergy, and thus greatly influenced early medieval knowledge of the natural world.

Rabanus Maurus (c. 780 – 856), a Christian monk and teacher, later archbishop of Mainz, who wrote a treatise on Computus and the encyclopedic work De universo. His teaching earned him the accolade of "Praeceptor Germaniae," or "the teacher of Germany."

Leo the Mathematician (c. 790 – after 869) was a Byzantine philosopher and logician associated with the Macedonian Renaissance. He wrote book-length works, poems, and many epigrams, and was also a compiler, who brought together a wide range of philosophical, medical, and astronomic texts. He composed his own medical encyclopaedia. He was archbishop of Thessalonica and later became the head of the Magnaura School of philosophy in Constantinople, where he taught Aristotelian logic.

Abbas Ibn Firnas (810 – 887), a polymath and inventor in Al-Andalus, made contributions in a variety of fields and is most known for his contributions to glass-making and aviation. He developed novel ways of manufacturing and using glass. A 17th century account states he broke his back at an unsuccessful attempt at flying in 875.

Al-Zahrawi (936-1013), a physician and scientist from Cordoba widely considered the father of modern surgery. He authored Al-Tasrif, a massive medical encyclopedia that detailed over 200 innovative surgical instruments and procedures. His books remained the definitive surgical textbooks in Europe for centuries.

Pope Sylvester II (c. 946–1003), a Christian scholar, teacher, mathematician, and later pope, reintroduced the abacus and armillary sphere to Western Europe after they had been lost for centuries following the Greco-Roman era. He was also responsible in part for the spread of the Hindu–Arabic numeral system in Western Europe.

Maslamah al-Majriti (died 1008), a mathematician, astronomer, and chemist in Al-Andalus, made contributions in many areas, from new techniques for surveying to updating and improving the astronomical tables of al-Khwarizmi and inventing a process for producing mercury oxide. He is most famous, though, for having helped transmit knowledge of mathematics and astronomy to Muslim Spain and Christian Western Europe.

Abulcasis (936-1013), a physician and scientist in Al-Andalus, is considered to be the father of modern surgery. He wrote numerous medical texts, developed many innovative surgical instruments, and developed a variety of new surgical techniques and practices. His texts were considered the definitive works on surgery in Europe until the Renaissance.

Eilmer of Malmesbury(b c.980), an English Benedictine monk who pioneered early aerodynamics. Around 1005, he launched a crude glider from a monastery tower, successfully traveling 200 meters before crashing, marking one of Europe's earliest documented aviation attempts.

== High Middle Ages ==
Michael Psellos (ca. 1017-1078), was a Byzantine philosopher, politician and historian. He combined Platonic philosophy with Christian doctrine and initiated a renewal of Byzantine classical learning that later influenced the Italian Renaissance. He also made contributions to Byzantine culture, such of a reform of the university curriculum to emphasize the Greek classics, like the Homeric literature that, with Platonist thought, he understood as precursory to Christian revelation. He composed various treatises and poetry, on themes in theology, philosophy, grammar, law, medicine, mathematics, and the natural sciences.

Constantine the African (c. 1020–1087), a Christian native of Carthage, is best known for his translating of ancient Greek and Roman medical texts from Arabic into Latin while working at the Schola Medica Salernitana in Salerno, Italy. Among the works he translated were those of Hippocrates and Galen.

Trota of Salerno (Died c.1097), a pioneering Italian physician and medical writer associated with the School of Salerno. She authored foundational texts on women's medicine, gynaecology, and dermatology.

Arzachel (1029–1100), the foremost astronomer of the early second millennium, lived in Al-Andalus and greatly expanded the understanding and accuracy of planetary models and terrestrial measurements used for navigation. He developed key technologies including the equatorium and universal latitude-independent astrolabe.

Avempace (died 1138), a famous physicist from Al-Andalus who had an important influence on later physicists such as Galileo. He was the first to theorize the concept of a reaction force for every force exerted.

Adelard of Bath (c. 1080 – c. 1152) was a 12th-century English scholar, known for his work in astronomy, astrology, philosophy and mathematics.

Avenzoar (1091–1161), from Al-Andalus, introduced an experimental method in surgery, employing animal testing in order to experiment with surgical procedures before applying them to human patients. He also performed the earliest dissections and postmortem autopsies on both humans as well as animals.

Hildegard of Bingen (c. 1098 – 17 September 1179), a German Benedictine abbess and polymath active in various fields as a writer, musical composer, philosopher, Christian mysticism, visionary, and as well a medical writer and practitioner.

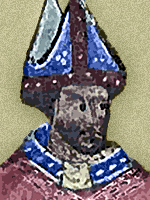
Robert Grosseteste

Gerard of Cremona (c. 1114 – 1187) was an Italian translator working at the court of Castile in Toledo, Spain and was a prominent figure in the Toledo School of Translators for translating Ptolemy's Almagest as well as Euclid's Elements from Arabic to Latin.

Averroes (1126-1198), a towering Andalusian polymath who wrote extensively on medicine, physics, and astronomy. His massive commentaries on Aristotle deeply influenced European universities.

Maimonides (1135/38-1204), a Sephardic Jewish philosopher and physician born in Cordoba, who published definitive texts on toxicology, pharmacology, and mental health that influenced both Islamic and Christian medical traditions.

Robert Grosseteste (1168–1253), Bishop of Lincoln, was the central character of the English intellectual movement in the first half of the 13th century and is considered the founder of scientific thought in Oxford. He had a great interest in the natural world and wrote texts on the mathematical sciences of optics, astronomy and geometry. In his commentaries on Aristotle's scientific works, he affirmed that experiments should be used in order to verify a theory, testing its consequences. Roger Bacon was influenced by his work on optics and astronomy.

Fibonacci (1170-1250), an Italian mathematician who introduced the Fibonacci sequence and Hindu-Arabic numerals to the Western world through his groundbreaking work, Liber Abaci.considered to be "the most talented Western mathematician of the Middle Ages".

Vincent of Beauvais (1184/94-1264), a French Dominican friar who compiled the Speculum Maius, the largest and most comprehensive encyclopedia of natural history, geology, and agriculture written in the medieval Christian world.

Albert the Great (1193–1280), Doctor Universalis, was one of the most prominent representatives of the philosophical tradition emerging from the Dominican Order. He is one of the thirty-three Saints of the Roman Catholic Church honored with the title of Doctor of the Church. He became famous for his vast knowledge and for his defence of the pacific coexistence between science and religion. Albert was an essential figure in introducing Greek and Islamic science into the medieval universities, although not without hesitation with regard to particular Aristotelian theses. In one of his most famous sayings he asserted: "Science does not consist in ratifying what others say, but of searching for the causes of phenomena." Thomas Aquinas was his most famous pupil.

John of Sacrobosco (c. 1195 – c. 1256) was a scholar, monk, and astronomer (probably English, but possibly Irish or Scottish) who taught at the University of Paris and wrote an authoritative and influential mediaeval astronomy text, the Tractatus de Sphaera; the Algorismus, which introduced calculations with Hindu-Arabic numerals into the European university curriculum; the Compotus ecclesiasticis on Easter reckoning; and the Tractatus de quadrante on the construction and use of the astronomical quadrant.

Jordanus de Nemore (late 12th, early 13th century) was one of the major pure mathematicians of the Middle Ages. He wrote treatises on mechanics ("the science of weights"), on basic and advanced arithmetic, on algebra, on geometry, and on the mathematics of stereographic projection.

Villard de Honnecourt (fl. 13th century), a French engineer and architect who made sketches of mechanical devices such as automatons and perhaps drew a picture of an early escapement mechanism for clockworks.

William of Saliceto (1210-1277), an Italian surgeon who advocated for integrating surgery with general medicine. He authored Chirurgia, a highly influential manual that rejected using hot iron cauterization in favor of the surgical knife.

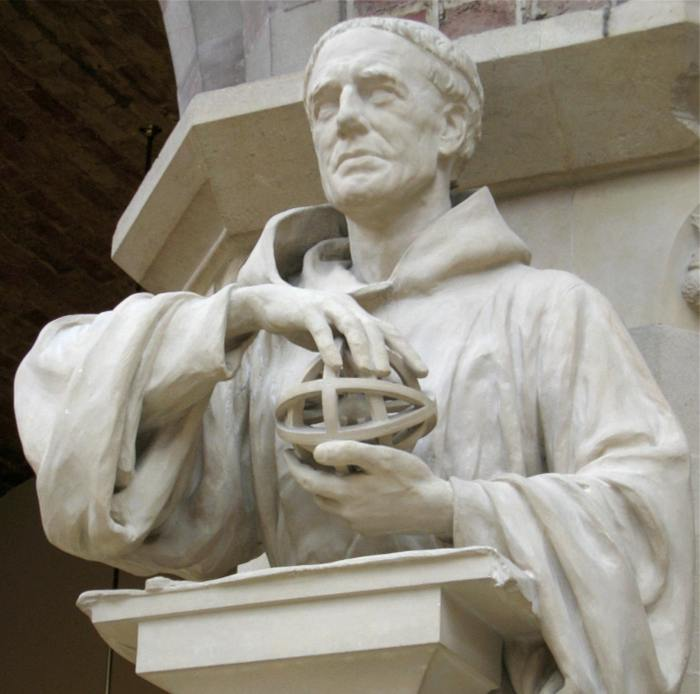
Roger Bacon

Roger Bacon (1214–94), Doctor Admirabilis, joined the Franciscan Order around 1240 where, influenced by Grosseteste, Alhacen and others, he dedicated himself to studies where he implemented the observation of nature and experimentation as the foundation of natural knowledge. Bacon wrote in such areas as mechanics, astronomy, geography and, most of all, optics. The optical research of Grosseteste and Bacon established optics as an area of study at the medieval university and formed the basis for a continuous tradition of research into optics that went all the way up to the beginning of the 17th century and the foundation of modern optics by Kepler.

Ibn al-Baitar (died 1248), a botanist and pharmacist in Al-Andalus, researched over 1400 types of plants, foods, and drugs and compiled pharmaceutical and medical encyclopedias documenting his research. These were used in the Islamic world and Europe until the 19th century.

Nicholas Myrepsos (Late 13th century) was a Byzantine physician known chiefly for his compendium on medical science which is still extant. He was at the court of John III Doukas Vatatzes. He compiled and revised Ancient Greek scripts including, but not limited to Galen, as well as writing his own compendium on medical science, named Dynameron. It consists of 48 sections, containing more than 2500 medical formulae, arranged according to their form and object. It remained the principal pharmaceutical code of the Parisian medical faculty until 1651. He is well known for the preparation, Aurea Alexandrina.

Theodoric Borgognoni (1205-1296) was an Italian Dominican friar and Bishop of Cervia who promoted the uses of both antiseptics and anaesthetics in surgery. His written work had a deep impact on Henri de Mondeville, who studied under him while living in Italy and later became the court physician for King Philip IV of France.

William of Saliceto (1210-1277) was an Italian surgeon of Lombardy who advanced medical knowledge and even challenged the work of the renowned Greco-Roman surgeon Galen (129-216 AD) by arguing that allowing pus to form in wounds was detrimental to the health of the patient.

Guido Bonatti (1210-1296), one of the most famous Italian astronomers and astrologers of the 13th century, who served as a royal advisor and compiled massive treatises tracking celestial bodies.His most famous work was his Liber Astronomiae or 'Book of Astronomy', written around 1277. This remained a classic astrology textbook for two centuries.

Petrus Peregrinus de Maricourt (fl. 13th century), a French mathematician, physicist, and writer who conducted experiments on magnetism and wrote the first extant treatise describing the properties of magnets.

Campanus of Novara (1220-1296), an Italian mathematician and astronomer who wrote a highly influential commentary on Euclid's Elements and designed his own equatorium to calculate planetary positions.

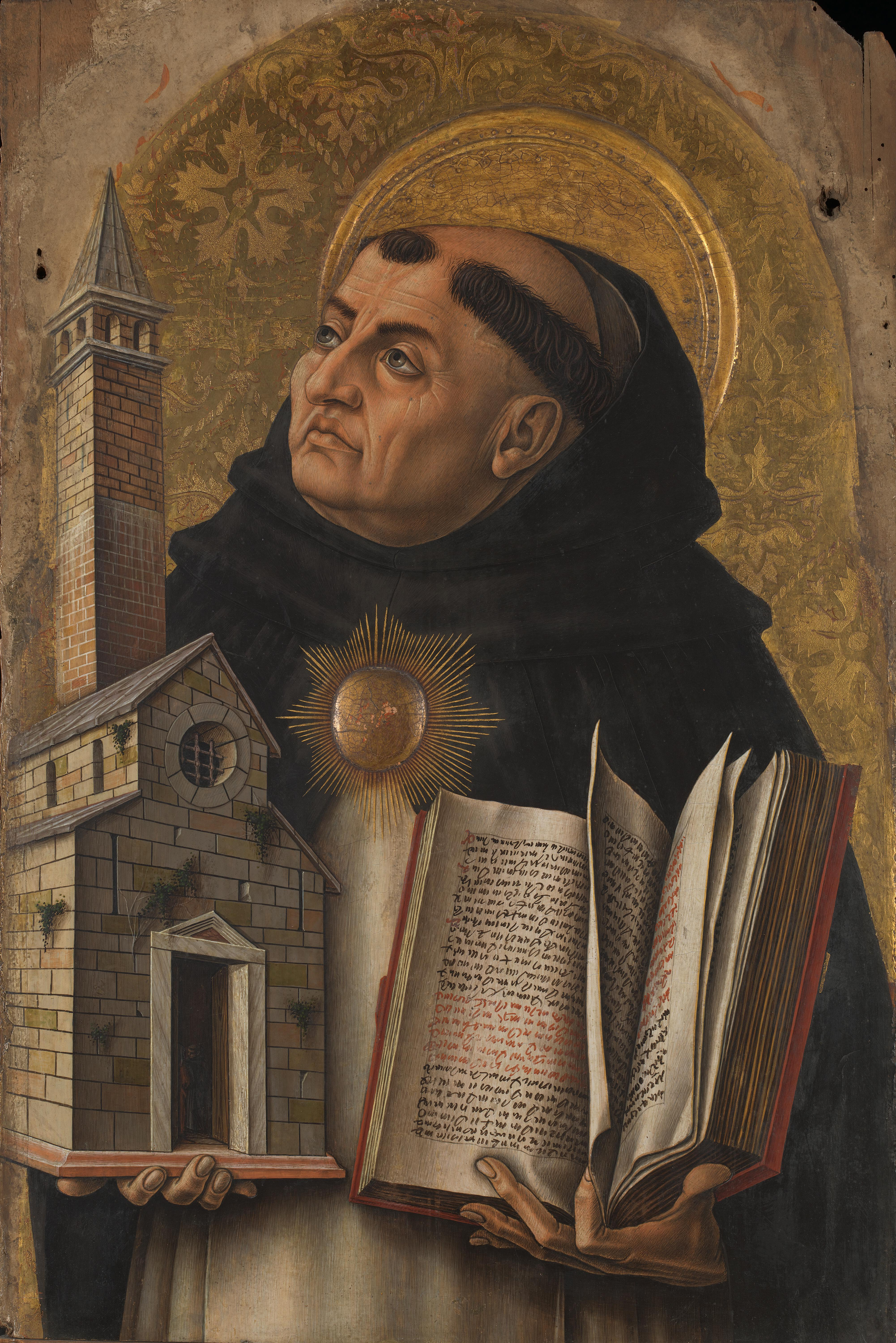
St. Thomas Aquinas

Thomas Aquinas (1227–74), Doctor Angelicus, was an Italian theologian and friar in the Dominican Order. As his mentor Albert the Great, he is a Catholic Saint and Doctor of the Church. In addition to his extensive commentaries on Aristotle's scientific treatises, he was also said to have written an important alchemical treatise titled Aurora Consurgens. However, his most lasting contribution to the scientific development of the period was his role in the incorporation of Aristotelianism into the Scholastic tradition.

Vitello (1230-1280/1314), a Silesian (Polish-German) friar and physicist whose massive treatise Perspectiva became a foundational text on European optics, influencing later figures like Johannes Kepler.

Arnaldus de Villa Nova (1235-1313) was an alchemist, astrologer, and physician from the Crown of Aragon who translated various Arabic medical texts, including those of Avicenna, and performed optical experiments with camera obscura.

Theodoric of Freiberg (c. 1250 – c. 1311) was a natural philosopher and theologian, who wrote highly original treatise on optics, explaining partially, colors and positions of primary and secondary rainbows

Pseudo-Geber (fl late 13 century) was an alchemist, who wrote Summa perfectionis magisterii, the most important medieval alchemical treaty.

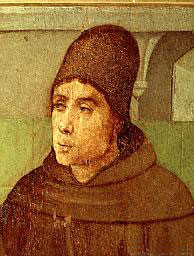
Duns Scotus

John Duns Scotus (1266–1308), Doctor Subtilis, was a member of the Franciscan Order, philosopher and theologian. Emerging from the academic environment of the University of Oxford. where the presence of Grosseteste and Bacon was still palpable, he had a different view on the relationship between reason and faith as that of Thomas Aquinas. For Duns Scotus, the truths of faith could not be comprehended through the use of reason. Philosophy, hence, should not be a servant to theology, but act independently. He was the mentor of one of the greatest names of philosophy in the Middle Ages: William of Ockham.

Petrus Peregrinus de Maricourt (fl. 1269), a French scholar and engineer who wrote the first extant treatise on magnetism (Epistola de magnete). He identified the concept of magnetic poles and experimented with early compasses.

Villard de Honnecourt (13th century), a French master mason and structural engineer whose preserved sketchbook contains advanced designs for mechanical saws, military trebuchets, and perpetual motion machines.

== Late Middle Ages ==
Theodore Metochites (1270–1332) was a Byzantine author and philosopher. His extant works comprises 20 Poems in dactylic hexameter, 18 orations (Logoi), Commentaries on Aristotle's writings on natural philosophy, an introduction to the study of Ptolemaic astronomy (Stoicheiosis astronomike), and 120 essays on various subjects, the Semeioseis gnomikai.

Mondino de Liuzzi (c. 1270-1326) was an Italian physician, surgeon, and anatomist from Bologna who was one of the first in medieval Europe to advocate for the public dissection of cadavers for advancing the field of anatomy. Greek and Roman taboos had meant that dissection was usually banned in ancient times, but Mondino de Liuzzi produced the first known anatomy textbook based on human dissection.

Manuel Bryennios (ca. 1275–1340) was a Byzantine scholar who flourished in Constantinople about 1300 teaching astronomy, mathematics and musical theory. His only surviving work is the Harmonika (Greek: Ἁρμονικά), which is a three-volume codification of Byzantine musical scholarship based on the classical Greek works of Ptolemy, Nicomachus, and the Neopythagorean authors on the numerological theory of music.

William of Ockham (1287–1347), Doctor Invincibilis, was an English Franciscan friar, philosopher, logician and theologian. Ockham defended the principle of parsimony, which could already be seen in the works of his mentor Duns Scotus. His principle later became known as Occam's Razor and states that if there are various equally valid explanations for a fact, then the simplest one should be chosen. This became a foundation of what would come to be known as the scientific method and one of the pillars of reductionism in science. Ockham probably died of the Black Plague. Jean Buridan and Nicole Oresme were his followers.

Gersonides (1288-1344), a French Jewish polymath who invented the Jacob's Staff (a vital tool for measuring angles between stars and the horizon) and made highly accurate observations of solar eclipses.

Jacopo Dondi dell'Orologio (1290-1359) was an Italian doctor, clockmaker, and astronomer from Padua who wrote on a number of scientific subjects such as pharmacology, surgery, astrology, and natural sciences. He also designed an astronomical clock.

Johannes de Muris (1290/95-1344), or John of Murs, was a French mathematician, astronomer, and music theorist best known for treatises on the ars nova musical style, titled Ars nove musice.

Richard of Wallingford (1292-1336), an English abbot, mathematician, astronomer, and horologist who designed an astronomical clock as well as an equatorium to calculate the lunar, solar and planetary longitudes, as well as predict eclipses.

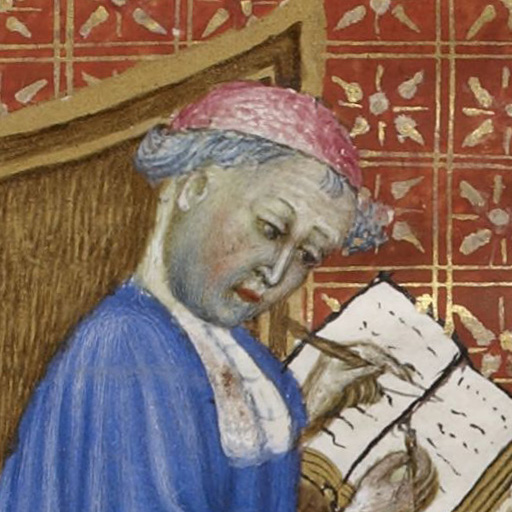
Nicole Oresme

Jean Buridan (1301–1359/62) was a French philosopher and priest. Although he was one of the most famous and influent philosophers of the late Middle Ages, his work today is not renowned by people other than philosophers and historians. One of his most significant contributions to science was the development of the theory of impetus, that explained the movement of projectiles and objects in free-fall. This theory gave way to the dynamics of Galileo Galilei and for Isaac Newton's famous principle of Inertia.

Guy de Chauliac (1300-1368) was a French physician and surgeon who wrote the Chirurgia magna, a widely read publication throughout medieval Europe that became one of the standard textbooks for medical knowledge for the next three centuries. During the Black Death he clearly distinguished Bubonic Plague and Pneumonic Plague as separate diseases, that they were contagious from person to person, and offered advice such as quarantine to avoid their spread in the population. He also served as the personal physician for three successive popes of the Avignon Papacy.

Thomas Bradwardine (1300-1349), was an English mathematician and one of the core Oxford Calculators. He formulated the first mathematical law of motion to describe velocity changes, predating modern algebraic kinematics.

John Arderne (1307-1392) was an English physician and surgeon who invented his own anesthetic that combined hemlock, henbane, and opium. In his writings, he also described how to properly excise and remove the abscess caused by anal fistula.

John Dumbleton (1310-1349), was an Oxford Calculator whose work Summa de logicis et naturalibus attempted to quantify physical phenomena like motion, velocity, and illumination.

William of Heytesbury (1313-1372/73), was an English logician and Oxford Calculator who formulated the Mean Speed Theorem, which correctly described the distance covered by a body undergoing uniform acceleration.

Albert of Saxony (1320-1390), a German logician and physicist who popularized Parisian kinematics across Europe and wrote extensively on the center of gravity and the acceleration of falling bodies.

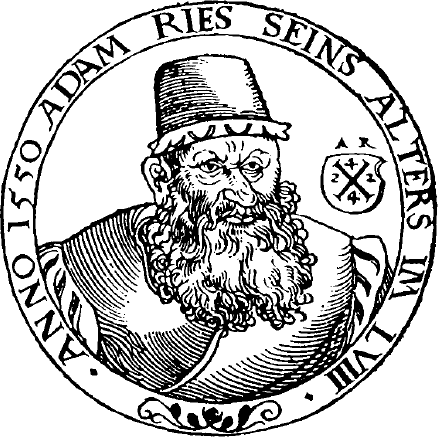
Adam Ries

Nicole Oresme (c. 1325–1382) was one of the most original thinkers of the 14th century. A theologian and bishop of Lisieux, he wrote influential treatises in both Latin and French on mathematics, physics, astronomy, and economics. In addition to these contributions, Oresme strongly opposed astrology and speculated about the possibility of a plurality of worlds.

Giovanni Dondi dell'Orologio (c. 1330-1388) was a clockmaker from Padua, Italy who designed the astarium, an astronomical clock and planetarium that utilized the escapement mechanism that had been recently invented in Europe. He also attempted to describe the mechanics of the Solar System with mathematical precision.

Richard Swineshead (fl.1340-1354) was an English mathematician, logician, and natural philosopher Known as "The Calculator," his treatise Liber Calculationum was a masterpiece of mathematical physics that analyzed complex mechanics and kinematics.

Gentile da Foligno (Died in 1348), an Italian physician who made early breakthroughs in understanding the physiology of the cardiovascular and urinary systems before succumbing to the plague while researching it.

Nicholas of Cusa (1401–1464) was a German philosopher, theologian, and astronomer who believed the Earth was not the center of the known universe, that celestial bodies were not perfect spheres, that their orbits were not entirely circular, and advanced the idea of relative velocity to explain the difference between theory and appearance of celestial objects.

Georg von Peuerbach (1423-1461) was an Austrian astronomer, poet, mathematician and instrument maker, best known for his streamlined presentation of Ptolemaic astronomy in the Theoricae Novae Planetarum. Peuerbach was instrumental in making astronomy, mathematics and literature simple and accessible for Europeans during the Renaissance and beyond.

Regiomontanus (1436-1476), a German mathematician and astronomer whose works perhaps influenced the heliocentric model of the solar system established by Nicolaus Copernicus (1473-1543) and seemed to accept the findings of the ancient Greek astronomer Aristarchus of Samos that the Sun was the center of the known universe.

Adam Ries (1492-1559), a German mathematician, who is known as the "father of modern calculating" because of his decisive contribution to the recognition that Roman numerals are unpractical and to their replacement by the considerably more practical Arabic numerals.

== See also ==
- Hunayn ibn Ishaq
