= Thomas Bradwardine =

English cleric, mathematician and courtier (c.1300–1349)

- Archbishop of Canterbury
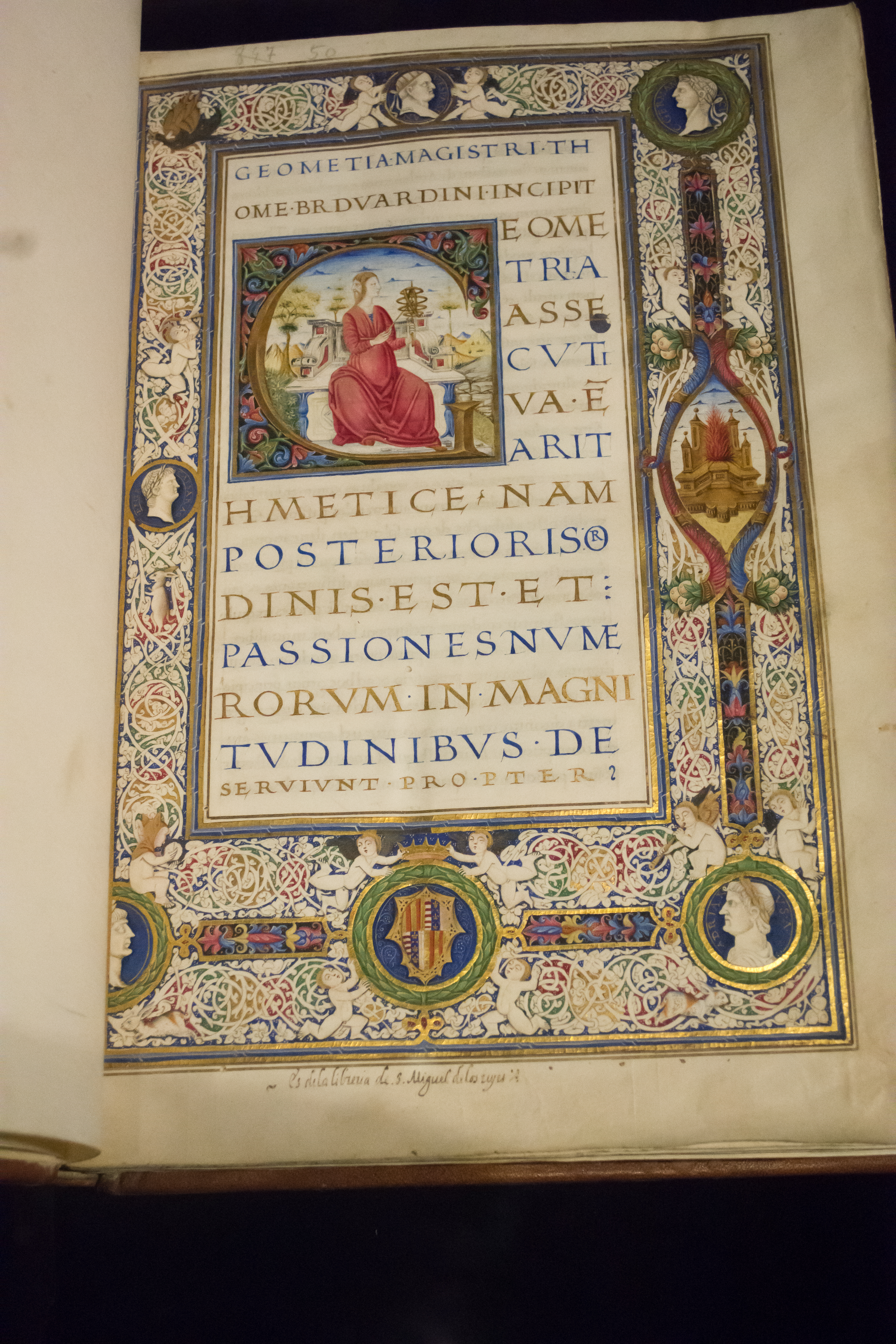
- Codex in Latin with the work Geometria speculativa, illustrated by Cola Rapino's workshop (1495)
- Appointed: 4 June 1349
- Term ended: 26 August 1349
- Predecessor: John de Ufford
- Successor: Simon Islip

Orders
- Consecration: 19 July 1349

Personal details
- Born: c. 1300 Chichester or Hartfield
- Died: 26 August 1349 Canterbury
- Buried: Canterbury
- Education: Merton College, Oxford

Education
- Education: Balliol College, Oxford

Philosophical work
- Era: Medieval philosophy
- Region: Western philosophy
- School: Scholasticism; Oxford Calculators
- Main interests: Theology, natural philosophy
- Notable ideas: Insolubilia

Thomas Bradwardine (c. 1300 – 26 August 1349) was an English cleric, scholar, mathematician, physicist, courtier and, very briefly, Archbishop of Canterbury. As a celebrated scholastic philosopher and doctor of theology, he is often called Doctor Profundus (medieval epithet, meaning "the Profound Doctor" or "the Profound Teacher").

== Life ==
Sources vary about Bradwardine's early life before receiving his degree in 1321. His exact date of birth is unknown but sources point to a date between 1290 and 1300. His place of birth is also unknown but some sources point to it being near Chichester, Sussex, or Harfield. The first concrete sources of his do not appear until he received his degree in 1321 from Balliol College, Oxford. Thomas Bradwardine became a Fellow of Merton College in Oxford, and was awarded his B.A. in August 1321. Bradwardine stayed at Merton College until 1333, when he was appointed Canon of Lincoln, and in 1337 he was appointed the chaplain of St Paul's Cathedral. His involvement with the ecclesiastical began in September 1333, when he was made the Canon of Lincoln. It is less corroborated by sources but it is stated that Bradwardine may have been the Bishop of Durham between 1335 and 1337. It is rumoured that this move to Durham helped put him into contact with King Edward III, which would lead to his eventual appointment of Chaplain of Old St Paul's Cathedral in London.

He acquired several degrees from Oxford; it is presumed he acquired them on these dates: B.A. by August 1321, an M.A. by 1323, a B.Th. by 1330, and a D.Th. by 1348.

Bradwardine was a precocious student, educated at Balliol College, Oxford, where he was a fellow by 1321; he took the degree of doctor of divinity, and acquired the reputation of a profound scholar, a skilful mathematician and an able theologian. He was also a gifted logician with theories on the insolubles and in particular the liar paradox.

Bradwardine subsequently moved to Merton College, Oxford on a fellowship. He was afterwards raised to the high offices of chancellor of the university and professor of divinity. Bradwardine (like his contemporary William of Ockham) was a culminating figure of the great intellectual movement at Oxford that had begun in the 1240s.

Bradwardine was an ordinary secular cleric, which gave him intellectual freedom but deprived him of the security and wherewithal that the Preaching Orders would have afforded; instead he turned to royal patronage. From being chancellor of the diocese of London as Dean of St Paul's, he became chaplain and confessor to Edward III, whom he attended during his wars in France at the Battle of Crécy, where he preached at the victory Mass, and at the subsequent siege of Calais. Edward repeatedly entrusted him with diplomatic missions. On his return to England, he was successively appointed prebendary of Lincoln and dean (1348). In 1349 the canons of the chapter at Canterbury elected him Archbishop following the death of Archbishop John Stratford, but Edward III withheld his consent, preferring his chancellor John de Ufford, perhaps loth to lose his trusted confessor. After Ufford died of the Black Death, 2 May, Bradwardine went to receive confirmation from Pope Clement VI at Avignon, but on his return he died of the plague at Rochester on 26 August 1349, 38 days after his consecration. He was buried at Canterbury.

Chaucer in "The Nun's Priest's Tale" (line 476) ranks Bradwardine with Augustine and Boethius. His great theological work, to modern eyes, is a treatise against the Pelagians, entitled De causa Dei contra Pelagium et de virtute causarum. Bradwardine's major treatise argued that space was an infinite void in which God could have created other worlds, which he would rule as he ruled this one. The "causes of virtue" include the influences of the planets, not as predestining a human career, but influencing a subject's essential nature. This astrophysical treatise was not published until it was edited by Sir Henry Savile and printed in London, 1618; its circulation in manuscript was very limited. The implications of the infinite void were revolutionary; to have pursued them would have threatened the singular relationship of man and this natural world to God (Cantor 2001); in it he treated theology mathematically. He wrote also De Geometria speculativa (printed at Paris, 1530); De Arithmetica practica (printed at Paris, 1502); De proportionibus velocitatum in motibus (1328) (printed at Paris, 1495; Venice, 1505); De Quadratura Circuli (Paris, 1495); and an Ars Memorative (Sloane MS no. 3974 in the British Library) – earning from the Pope the title of the "Profound Doctor". Another text, De Continuo is more tenuously credited to him and thought to be written sometime between 1328 and 1325.

== Theology ==
Bradwardine helped revive Augustinian Theology during his time in the fourteenth century. He wrote extensively on various subjects, including speculative arithmetic, geometry, and the workings of the human mind. As a theologian and scholar of natural philosophy, Bradwardine rejected William of Ockham's belief that God could know future events and contingencies in a limited sense, insisting instead that God's knowledge is absolute.

Bradwardine was influenced by the Augustinian soteriology, which centered on a divine monergism and implied a double predestination. He accepted the idea of predestination and suggested that all evil acts of Human will were due to God. He argued that providence is inseparable from predestination, and rejected the notion that humans could do good of their own volition. Instead, he claimed they act solely according to God's will. Bradwardine would go on to write that free will and predestination through predeterminism are compatible, a theory known as compatibilism.

== Science ==
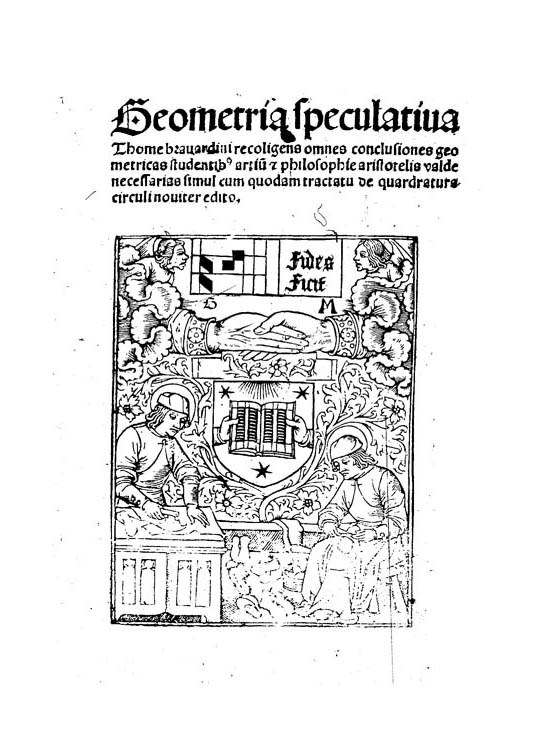
Geometria speculativa, 1495

Merton College sheltered a group of dons devoted to natural science, mainly physics, astronomy and mathematics, rivals of the intellectuals at the University of Paris. Bradwardine was one of these Oxford Calculators, studying mechanics with William Heytesbury, Richard Swineshead, and John Dumbleton. The Oxford Calculators distinguished kinematics from dynamics, emphasising kinematics, and investigating instantaneous velocity. They first formulated the mean speed theorem: a body moving with constant velocity travels the same distance as an accelerated body in the same time if its velocity is half the final speed of the accelerated body. They also demonstrated this theorem – the foundation of "The Law of Falling Bodies" – long before Galileo, who is generally credited with it.

The mathematical physicist and historian of science Clifford Truesdell, wrote:

The now published sources prove to us, beyond contention, that the main kinematical properties of uniformly accelerated motions, still attributed to Galileo by the physics texts, were discovered and proved by scholars of Merton college.... In principle, the qualities of Greek physics were replaced, at least for motions, by the numerical quantities that have ruled Western science ever since. The work was quickly diffused into France, Italy, and other parts of Europe. Almost immediately, Giovanni di Casale and Nicole Oresme found how to represent the results by geometrical graphs, introducing the connection between geometry and the physical world that became a second characteristic habit of Western thought ...

In Tractatus de proportionibus (1328), Bradwardine extended the theory of proportions of Eudoxus of Cnidus to anticipate the concept of exponential growth, later developed by the Bernoulli and Euler, with compound interest as a special case. Arguments for the mean speed theorem (above) require the modern mathematical concept of limit, so Bradwardine had to use arguments of his day. Mathematician and mathematical historian Carl Benjamin Boyer writes, "Bradwardine developed the Boethian theory of double or triple or, more generally, what we would call 'n-tuple' proportion". Bradwardine attempted to reconcile contradictions in physics, where he largely adopted Aristotle's description of the physical universe.

Bradwardine rejected four opinions concerning the link between power, resistance, and speed on the basis that were inconsistent with Aristotle's or because they did not align with what could be easily observed regarding motion. He does this by examining the nature of ratios. The first opinion Bradwardine contemplates before rejecting is one he attributes to Avempace that states " that speeds follow the excesses of motive powers over resistances", following the formula (V ∝ [M−R], where V = speed M = motive power, and R = resistance). he second opinion follows the formula (V ∝ [M−R]/R), which states "that speeds follow the ratio of the excesses of the motive over the resisting powers to the resisting powers". Bradwardine claims this as the work of Averroes. The third opinion concerns the traditional interpretation of the Aristotelian rules of motion and states "that the speeds follow the inverse of the resistances when the moving powers are the same (V ∝ 1/R when M is constant) and follow the moving powers when the resistances are the same (V ∝ M when R is constant)". His last rejection was "that speeds do not follow any ratio because motive and resistive powers are quantities of different species and so cannot form ratios with each other". "Bradwardine's own rule is that the ratio of speeds follows the ratios of motive to resistive powers."

Bradwardine did identify one measurement error in Aristotle's law of motion. Bradwardine's identification of this error was described by Ernest Moody as a "radical shift from Aristotelian dynamics to modern dynamics, initiated in the early fourteenth century." Aristotle's calculation of average speed was criticized by Bradwardine for not examining "the whole question of how moment-to-moment velocities are related within the whole time of the movement." Bradwardine also believed Aristotle contradicted himself with his explanation of resistance in motion. Aristotle believed "that a force has to be greater than its resistance in order to move, and the "proportion" (Bradwardine's word; we would say ratio) of force to resistance equaling the proportion of distance to time." Bradwardine did not accept the explanation and instead proposed "that the rate of velocity is the ratio of an exponential increase in force to resistance." Bradwardine's explanation does not align with the modern rules of the rates of motion, yet his goal to reconcile Aristotle's claim was accomplished and he was the first person to be credited for using exponential functions in an attempt to explain the laws of motion.

Boyer also writes that "the works of Bradwardine had contained some fundamentals of trigonometry gleaned from Muslim sources". Yet "Bradwardine and his Oxford colleagues did not quite make the breakthrough to modern science" (Cantor 2001, p. 122).

Al-Kindi in particular seemed to influence Bradwardine, though it is unclear whether this was directly or indirectly. Nonetheless, Bradwardine's work bears many similarities to the work of Al-Kindi, Quia primos (or De Gradibus). Gerard of Cremona's Latin translation of Quia primos (or De Gradibus) would have been available to Bradwardine, but Roger Bacon seemed to be the only European philosopher to have had a direct connection to the book, but not to the degree of Arnald of Villanova. Nonetheless, Bradwardine's work bears many similarities to the work of Al-Kindi.

== Art of memory ==
Bradwardine was also a practitioner and exponent of the art of memory, a loosely associated group of mnemonic principles and techniques used to organise memory impressions, improve recall, and assist in the combination and 'invention' of ideas. His De Memoria Artificiali (c. 1335) discusses memory training current during his time.

Bradwardine's On Acquiring a Trained Memory, translated by Mary Carruthers, contains, as Carruthers describes it, was similar to Cicero's work on the art of memory. She states, "Bradwardine's art is notable for its detailed description of several techniques for fixing and recalling specific material through the use of graphically detailed, brilliantly colored, and vigorously animated mental images, grouped together in a succession of pictures or organized scenes, whose internal order recalls not just particular content but the relationship among its parts." She acknowledges this being similar to active imaging described by Cicero, along with the memory devices for things and words being changed in rhetoric, but are distinct since the imagery Bradwardine uses is decidedly medieval in nature.

== Legacy ==
Bradwardine's theories on the insolubilia including the liar paradox were a great influence on the work of Jean Buridan. Bradwardine's work on kinematics was also influential to Buridan. Despite never rejecting the papacy, Thomas Bradwardine is cited as holding Reformation theology before Luther and Calvin.

His De Causa Dei influenced the theology of John Wycliffe on grace and predestination.

== Works ==
- Preclarissimum mathematicarum opus (in Latin). Valencia: Jeronimo Amiquet. 1503.

== Latin works and English translations ==
- Insolubilia (Insolubles), Latin text and English translation by Stephen Read, Leuven, Peeters Editions (Dallas Medieval Texts and Translations, 10), 2010.
- De insolubilibus (On Insolubles), edited by Marie Louise Roure in 'La problématique des propositions insolubles du XIIIe siècle et du début du XIVe, suivie de l'édition des traités de William Shyreswood, Walter Burleigh et Thomas Bradwardine', Archives d'histoire doctrinale et littéraire du moyen Age 37, 1970: 205–326.
- De incipit et desinit (On 'It Begins' and 'It Ceases'), ed. Lauge O. Nielsen, Cahiers de l'Institut du moyen Age grec et Latin 42, 1982: 1–83.
- Geometria speculativa (Speculative Geometry), Latin text and English translation with an introduction and a commentary by George Molland, Stuttgart: Steiner Verlag, 1989.
- Arithmetica speculativa (Speculative Arithmetic) Parisiis: G. Marchant, 1495
- De proportionibus velocitatum in motibus (On the Ratios of Velocities in Motions) Latin text and English translation by H. Lamar Crosby Jr. in: 'Thomas of Bradwardine: His Tractatus de Proportionibus: Its Significance for the Development of Mathematical Physics', Madison, WI: University of Wisconsin Press, 1955.
- De continuo (On the Continuum), edited by John Emery Murdoch in 'Geometry and the Continuum in the Fourteenth Century: A Philosophical Analysis of Thomas Bradwardine's Tractatus de continuo', PhD thesis, University of Wisconsin, 1957.
- De futuris contingentibus (On Future Contingents): edited by Genest, Jean-François (1979). "Le De futuris contingentibus de Thomas Bradwardine". Recherches Augustiniennes et Patristiques. 14: 249–336. doi:10.1484/J.RA.5.102303. ISSN 0484-0887.
- De causa Dei contra Pelagium et de virtute causarum ad suos Mertonenses, libri tres (In Defense of God Against the Pelagians and on the Power of Causes, in three books), edited by Henry Savile, London: 1618; reprinted at Frankfurt: Minerva, 1964.
- Commentary on the Sentences of Peter Lombard: some questions found in a manuscript at the Bibliothèque Nationale de Paris are published in: J.-F. Genest and Katherine Tachau, 'La lecture de Thomas Bradwardine sur les Sentences', Archives d'histoire doctrinale et littéraire du Moyen Age 57, 1990: 301–6.
- De memoria artificiali adquirenda (On Acquiring a Trained Memory), ed. Mary Carruthers, Journal of Medieval Latin, 2, (1992): 25–43; translated in Carruthers M., The Book of Memory: A Study of Memory in Medieval Culture, New York: Cambridge Univ. Press. 1990, pp. 281–8; Carruthers M. and Ziolkowski J., The Medieval Craft of Memory, Philadelphia: Univ. of Pennsylvania Press, 2002, pp. 205–14.
- Gillmeister H. (ed.), "An intriguing fourteenth-century document: Thomas Bradwardine's De arte memorativa". Archiv für das Studium der neueren Sprachen und Literaturen 220, 1983, pp. 111–4.
- Green-Pedersen N.-J. (ed.), "Bradwardine (?) on Ockham's doctrine of consequences: an edition". Cahiers de l'Institute de moyen age grec et latin, 42, 1982, pp. 85–150.
- Lamar Crosby H. (ed.), Thomas of Bradwardine: his Tractatus de Proportionibus: its significance for the development of mathematical physics. Madison, University of Wisconsin Press, 1955.

== See also ==
- Augustinian soteriology
- List of Roman Catholic scientist-clerics

Catholic Church titles
Preceded by John de Ufford	Archbishop of Canterbury; 1349–1349	Succeeded by Simon Islip
