= List of British scholars =

This is a list of scholars from the Isle of Britain.

== Medieval ==
- Alcuin (735-804), mathematician and scholar
- Walcher of Malvern, astrologer
- Adelard of Bath (1080–1150), mathematician, astronomer, physicist, alchemist and philosopher
- Robert of Chester, translator
- Robert Grosseteste (1168–1253), philosopher
- Gilbertus Anglicus (1180-1250), physician
- Johannes de Sacrobosco (1195–1256), mathematician and astronomer
- Roger Bacon (1212–1292), mathematician, astronomer, alchemist and philosopher
- John Peckham (1230–1292), astronomer
- William Ockham (1287–1347), theologian, philosopher and physicist
- Richard of Wallingford (1292–1336), mathematician and astronomer
- John Dastin (1293–1386), alchemist
- Thomas Bradwardine (1300–1349), mathematician, physicist, theologian and philosopher
- Simon Bredon (1300–1379), mathematician
- Richard Swineshead (1340-1354), philosopher
- William Heytesbury (1313-1373), philosopher
- John Westwyk (14th century), astronomer
- John Ardarne (1307–1392), physician
- George Ripley (1415–1490), alchemist
- Thomas Norton (1416–1513), alchemist

== 16th–17th century ==
- Emery Molyneux (1500–1598), astronomer
- William Gilbert (1544–1603), physician and philosopher
- John Gerard (1545–1612), botanist
- Robert Hues (1553–1632), geographer and mathematician
- Francis Bacon (1561–1626), philosopher
- William Crabtree (1610–1644), mathematician and astronomer
- Jeremiah Horrocks (1618–1641), astronomer
- Nicholas Culpeper (1616–1654), physician
- Lawrence Rooke (1622–1662), mathematician and astronomer
- Francis Willoughby (1635–1672), biologist
- İsaac Barrow (1640–1676), mathematician and theologian
- Robert Hooke (1635–1703), scientist: physicist, botanist, biologist, philosopher, sage, mathematician, astronomer, architect, wise, inventor
- İsaac Newton (1642–1727), mathematician, physicist, astronomer, alchemist, philosopher, theologian, inventor
- Thomas Savery (1650–1715), architect, inventor an polymath
- John Flamsteed (1646–1719), astronomer

== See also ==
- List of British innovations and discoveries
- History of England
