= John Dumbleton =

English philosopher

John of Dumbleton (Latin Ioannes De Dumbleton; c. 1310 – c. 1349) was a member of the Dumbleton village community in Gloucestershire, a southwestern county in England. Although obscure, he is considered a significant English fourteenth-century philosopher for his contributions to logic, natural philosophy, and physics. Dumbleton’s masterwork is his Summa Logicae et Philosophiae Naturalis (Summary of Logic and Natural Philosophy), likely to have been composed just before the time of his death.

== Life ==
John of Dumbleton is recorded to have become a fellow at Merton College, Oxford (ca. 1338–9) and to have studied with the likes of William Heytesbury, Thomas Bradwardine, and Richard Swineshead. These four medieval scholastics held a common bond in that their study interests were in a similar field, but the method of study which brought these fellows into the same sphere of learning was of a more esoteric bent than modern university methods. They were interested in mathematics and logical analysis for the purposes of natural philosophy, theology, and an a priori type of mathematical physics (not to be confused with modern, empirical, experimental physics). Thus, the physics postulations and conjectures made by Dumbleton and his Oxford contemporaries were primarily done without any application of physical experimentation. Dumbleton, along with the other three Merton philosophers, received the moniker 'Calculators' for their adherence to mathematics and logical disputation when solving philosophical and theological problems. After being named a fellow at The Queen's College, Oxford (1340) and making a return to Merton College (1344–45) Dumbleton is recorded to have studied theology in Paris (ca. 1345–47) for a brief period before returning to finish his studies at Merton College (1347–1348). The fact that no extant copy of Dumbleton's Summa Logicae et Philosophiae Naturalis is complete (nor edited) leads one to wonder if his death (ca. 1349) abruptly terminated the possibility of its completion.

== Philosophical contributions ==
Though there was a considerable reverence for Platonism in Oxford during the fourteenth century, the rebirth of Aristotelianism held sway in the higher Parisian learning circuits. Dumbleton, who studied in Paris for a brief time, was not immune to this spell. In fact, his compendium Summa Logica et Philosophiae Naturalis, has an overview of many principles found in Aristotle's Physics. The Summa is broken into ten different sections. The ninth section is uncompleted in all extant manuscripts. The tenth section, which, according to Dumbleton, was supposed to examine "universals and signification," shows no evidence of ever being worked on. Although this is the case, the other sections of Dumbleton's Summa are filled with medieval philosophical gems. A couple of emphasized topics to be found in the first section are "certitude and the psychology of logic." It includes a medieval examination of epistemological issues; such as the certainty of knowledge. A strong Aristotelian appreciation is felt in the remaining sections, since the majority of the work is dedicated to commenting on the first eight chapters of Aristotle's Physics, and his treatises On Generation and Corruption & On the Soul. In those sections of the Summa will be found discussions and commentary on such topics as: alteration, change (i.e., the measure of motion), properties of natural bodies and their forms (parts II and III); questions dealing with classification (e.g., "whether light belongs to some element"; motions and changes of bodies/forms (parts IV – VI); and in the final sections an examination of the intellect and matters of the soul (parts VII – IX). It is difficult to assess why Dumbleton's Summa did not have a significant following, but it may have been because it was never completed or that it was not circulated well enough.

== Scientific contributions ==
The four Merton ‘Calculators’ were not only well versed in the current issues of philosophy during the fourteenth century; they actually initiated new groundbreaking scientific postulations. John of Dumbleton was no exception. Because he concurred with many of the positions held by William Ockham (1288–1348)—especially the idea that is commonly referred to as Ockham’s razor, which states that the most simplistic explanations are ideal—he may have learned how to succinctly formulate his scientific conjectures.

Of Dumbleton’s many scientific theories there is one in particular that is worth mentioning here. By making the assumption that bodies are finite, Dumbleton was able to conjecture that contraction or expansion, as in cases of condensation or rarefaction, does not eliminate any parts of a body; rather, a “denumerable number of parts” always exists. Though the idea of molecules was not theorized at this time, Dumbleton’s speculation helped to tame the view that bodies have infinitely divisible parts.

Dumbleton was one of the first to express functional relationships in graphical form. He gave a proof of the mean speed theorem stating that "the latitude of a uniformly difform movement corresponds to the degree of the midpoint" and used this method to study the quantitative decrease in intensity of illumination, stating that it was not linearly proportional to the distance, but was unable to expose the Inverse-square law, which was postponed nearly 250 years until its discovery by Johannes Kepler in 1604.

== Criticism ==
It is difficult to determine what methodology the Oxford 'Calculators' used when they were conjecturing and postulating theorems by way of abstraction (i.e., without empirical investigation). This criticism is not expressly made toward Dumbleton's conjectures but more broadly aimed at the methodology of the whole group of Mertonian physicists. One suggestion is that they may have been trying to create a mathematical picture of the Aristotelian world-view. If this were true, it would show why empirical investigation was not their modus operandi. In other words, the Oxford Calculators' works show respect for quantitative reasoning; opposed to a posteriori evaluations. Regardless of whether they opted against empirical investigation for theological reasons or simply because the debut of the scientific method was not ready to be revealed, one ought to regard John of Dumbleton and his contemporaries as exemplary pioneers in mathematics, physics, and logical discourse.

== Writings ==
- Summa Logica et Philosophiae Naturalis (c. 1349; There are at least twenty extant manuscripts)
- Compendium Sex Conclusionum
- Expositio Capituli Quarti Bradwardini de Proportionibus (1332; Exposition of the Fourth Chapter of Bradwardine's De Proportionibus)

== See also ==
- Medieval European scientists
