= Gerard of Brussels =

13th-century mathematician and philosopher

Gerard of Brussels (French: Gérard de Bruxelles, Latin: Gerardus Bruxellensis) was an early thirteenth-century geometer and philosopher known primarily for his Latin book Liber de motu (On Motion), which was a pioneering study in kinematics, probably written between 1187 and 1260. It has been described as "the first Latin treatise that was to take the fundamental approach to kinematics that was to characterize modern kinematics." He brought the works of Euclid and Archimedes back into popularity and was a direct influence on the Oxford Calculators (four kinematicists of Merton College) in the next century. Gerard is cited by Thomas Bradwardine in his Tractatus de proportionibus velocitatum (1328). His chief contribution was in moving away from Greek mathematics and closer to the notion of "a ratio of two unlike quantities such as distance and time", which is how modern physics defines velocity.

== Modern editions ==
- Clagett, Marshall. "The Liber de motu of Gerard of Brussels and the Origins of Kinematics in the West," Osiris, 12(1956):73–175.
