= Endemann =

Endemann is a surname. Notable people with the surname include:

- Alicia Endemann (born 1988), German actress, beauty queen, and model
- Gernot Endemann (1942–2020), German film and television actor
- Wilhelm Endemann (1825–1899), German jurist
- Till Endemann, director of Vater Morgana
