= Oxford Calculators =

Group of 14th-century English mathematicians and philosophers

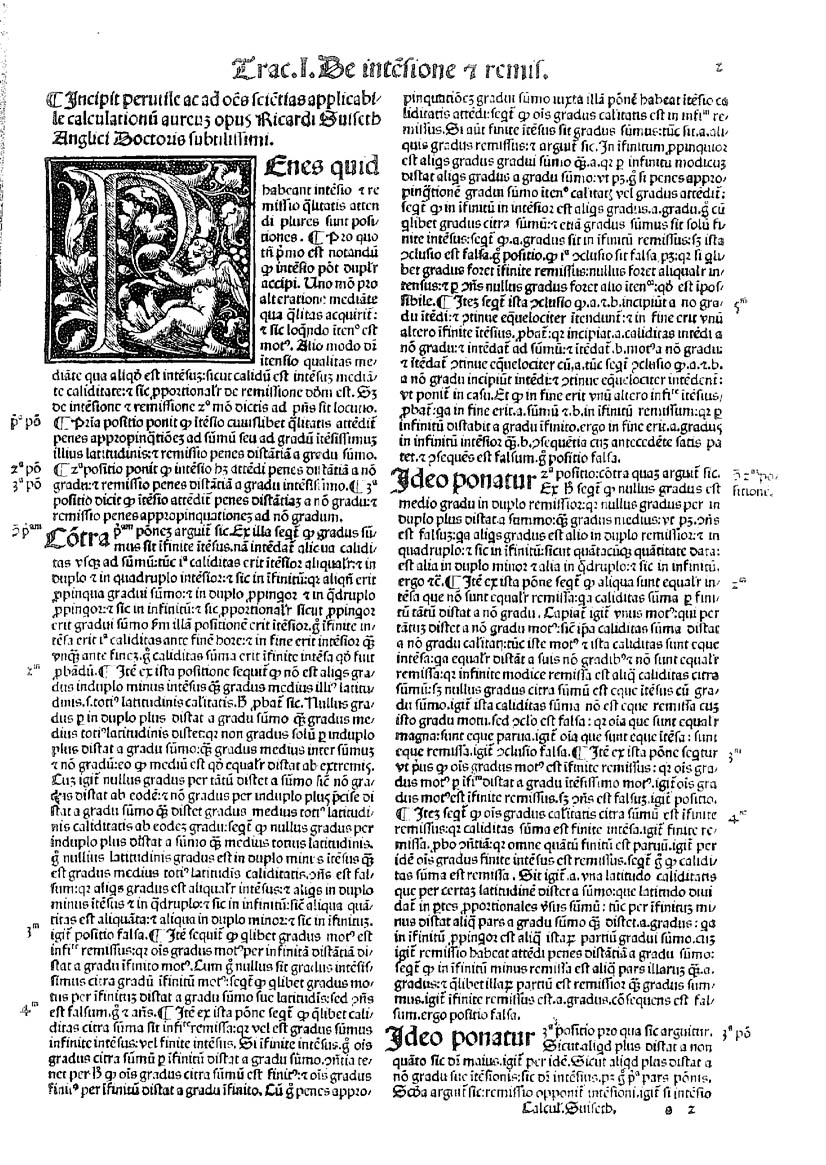
Richard Swineshead, Calculator, 1520

The Oxford Calculators were a group of 14th-century thinkers, almost all associated with Merton College, Oxford; for this reason they were dubbed "The Merton School". Their work incorporated a logical and mathematical approach to philosophical problems. The key "calculators", writing in the second quarter of the 14th century, were Thomas Bradwardine, William Heytesbury, Richard Swineshead, and John Dumbleton. Using the slightly earlier works of Walter Burley, Gerard of Brussels, and Nicole Oresme, these individuals expanded upon the concepts of 'latitudes' and what real world applications they could apply them to.

== Science ==
The Oxford Calculators' advances were initially purely mathematical but later became relevant to mechanics. Using Aristotelian logic and physics, they studied and attempted to quantify physical and observable characteristics such as: heat, force, color, density, and light. Aristotle believed that only length and motion were able to be quantified. However, they used his philosophy and proved it untrue by being able to calculate things such as temperature and power. Although they attempted to quantify these observable characteristics, their interests lay more in the philosophical and logical aspects than in natural world. They used numbers to disagree philosophically and prove the reasoning of "why" something worked the way it did and not only "how" something functioned the way that it did.

Historian David C. Lindberg and professor Michael H. Shank in their 2013 book, Cambridge History of Science, Volume 2: Medieval Science, wrote:

Like Bradwardine's theorem, the methods and results of the other Oxford Calculators spread to the continent over the next generation, appearing most notably at the University of Paris in the works of Albert of Saxony, Nicole Oresme, and Marsilius of Inghen.

Lawrence M. Principe wrote:

A group known as the Oxford Calculators had begun applying mathematics to motion in the 1300s; in fact, Galileo begins his exposition of kinematics in the Two New Sciences with a theorem they enunciated. But Galileo went much further by linking mathematical abstraction tightly with experimental observation.

=== Mean Speed Theorem ===
The Oxford Calculators distinguished kinematics from dynamics, emphasizing kinematics, and investigating instantaneous velocity. It is through their understanding of geometry and how different shapes could be used to represent a body in motion. The Calculators related these bodies in relative motion to geometrical shapes and also understood that a right triangle's area would be equivalent to a rectangle's if the rectangle's height was half of the triangle's. This, and developing Al-Battani's work on trigonometry is what led to the formulating of the mean speed theorem (though it was later credited to Galileo) which is also known as "The Law of Falling Bodies". A basic definition of the mean speed theorem is; a body moving with constant speed will travel the same distance as an accelerated body in the same period of time as long as the body with constant speed travels at half of the sum of initial and final velocities for the accelerated body. Its earliest known mention is found in Heytesbury's Rules for Solving Sophisms: a body uniformly accelerated or decelerated for a given time covers the same distance as it would if it were to travel for the same time uniformly with the speed of the middle instant of its motion, which is defined as its mean speed. Relative motion, also referred to as local motion, can be defined as motion relative to another object where the values for acceleration, velocity, and position are dependent upon a predetermined reference point.

The mathematical physicist and historian of science Clifford Truesdell, wrote:

The now published sources prove to us, beyond contention, that the main kinematical properties of uniformly accelerated motions, still attributed to Galileo by the physics texts, were discovered and proved by scholars of Merton college.... In principle, the qualities of Greek physics were replaced, at least for motions, by the numerical quantities that have ruled Western science ever since. The work was quickly diffused into France, Italy, and other parts of Europe. Almost immediately, Giovanni di Casale and Nicole Oresme found how to represent the results by geometrical graphs, introducing the connection between geometry and the physical world that became a second characteristic habit of Western thought ...

=== Boethian Theory ===
In Tractatus de proportionibus (1328), Bradwardine extended the theory of proportions of Eudoxus to anticipate the concept of exponential growth, later developed by Bernoulli and Euler, with compound interest as a special case. Arguments for the mean speed theorem (above) require the modern concept of limit, so Bradwardine had to use arguments of his day. Mathematician and mathematical historian Carl Benjamin Boyer writes, "Bradwardine developed the Boethian theory of double or triple or, more generally, what we would call 'n-tuple' proportion".

Boyer also writes that "the works of Bradwardine had contained some fundamentals of trigonometry". Yet "Bradwardine and his Oxford colleagues did not quite make the breakthrough to modern science." The most essential missing tool was algebra.

A group known as the Oxford Calculators had begun applying mathematics to motion in the 1300s; in fact, Galileo begins his exposition of kinematics in the Two New Sciences with a theorem they enunciated. But Galileo went much further by linking mathematical abstraction tightly with experimental observation.

=== Bradwardine's Rule ===
Lindberg and Shank also wrote:

In Book VII of Physics, Aristotle had treated in general the relation between powers, moved bodies, distance, and time, but his suggestions there were sufficiently ambiguous to give rise to considerable discussion and disagreement among his medieval commentators. The most successful theory, as well as the most mathematically sophisticated, was proposed by Thomas Bradwardine in his Treatise on the Ratios of Speeds in Motions. In this tour de force of medieval natural philosophy, Bradwardine devised a single simple rule to govern the relationship between moving and resisting powers and speeds that was both a brilliant application of mathematics to motion and also a tolerable interpretation of Aristotle's text.

The initial goal of Bradwardine's Rule was to come up with a single rule in a general form that would show the relationship between moving and resisting powers and speed while at the same time precluded motion when the moving power is less than or equal to the resisting power. Before Bradwardine decided to use his own theory of compounded ratios in his own rule he considered and rejected four other opinions on the relationship between powers, resistances, and speeds. He then went on to use his own rule of compounded ratios which says that the ratio of speeds follows the ratios of motive to resistive powers. By applying medieval ratio theory to a controversial topic in Aristotle's Physics, Brawardine was able to make a simple, definite, and sophisticated mathematical rule for the relationship between speeds, powers, and resistances. Bradwardine's Rule was quickly accepted in the fourteenth century, first among his contemporaries at Oxford, where Richard Swineshead and John Dumbleton used it for solving sophisms, the logical and physical puzzles that were just beginning to assume and important place in the undergraduate arts curriculum.

=== Latitude of Forms ===
The Latitude of Forms is a topic that many of the Oxford Calculators published volumes on. Developed by Nicole Oresme, a “Latitude" is an abstract concept of a range that forms may vary inside of. Before latitudes were introduced into mechanics, they were used in both medical and philosophical fields. Medical authors Galen and Avicenna can be given credit for the origin of the concept. “Galen says, for instance, that there is a latitude of health which is divided into three parts, each in turn having some latitude. First, there is the latitude of healthy bodies, second the latitude of neither health nor sickness, and third the latitude of sickness.” The calculators attempted to measure and explain these changes in latitude concretely and mathematically. John Dumbleton discusses latitudes in Part II and Part III of his work the Summa. He is critical of earlier philosophers in Part II as he believes latitudes are measurable and quantifiable and later in Part III of the Summa attempts to use latitudes to measure local motion. Roger Swineshead defines five latitudes for local motion being: First, the latitude of local motion, Second, the latitude of velocity of local motion, Third, the latitude of slowness of the local motion, Fourth, the latitude of the acquisition of the latitude of local motion, and the Fifth being, the latitude of the loss of the latitude of local motion. Each of these latitudes are infinite and are comparable to the velocity, acceleration, and deceleration of the local motion of an object.

== People ==
=== Thomas Bradwardine ===
Thomas Bradwardine was born in 1290 in Sussex, England. An attending student educated at Balliol College, Oxford, he earned various degrees. He was a secular cleric, a scholar, a theologist, a mathematician, and a physicist. He became chancellor of the diocese of London and Dean of St Paul's, as well as chaplain and confessor to Edward III. During his time at Oxford, he authored many books including: De Geometria Speculativa (printed in Paris, 1530), De Arithmetica Practica (printed in Paris, 1502), and De Proportionibus Velocitatum in Motibus (printed in Paris in 1495). Bradwardine furthered the study of using mathematics to explain physical reality. Drawing on the work of Robert Grosseteste, Robert Kilwardby and Roger Bacon, his work was in direct opposition to William of Ockham.

Aristotle suggested that velocity was proportional to force and inversely proportional to resistance, doubling the force would double the velocity but doubling the resistance would halve the velocity (V ∝ F/R). Bradwardine objected saying that this is not observed because the velocity does not equal zero when the resistance exceeds the force. Instead, he proposed a new theory that, in modern terms, would be written as (V ∝ log F/R), which was widely accepted until the late sixteenth century.

=== William Heytesbury ===
William Heytesbury was a bursar at Merton until the late 1330s and he administered the college properties in Northumberland. Later in his life he was a chancellor of Oxford. He was the first to discover the mean-speed theorem, later "The Law of Falling Bodies". Unlike Bradwardine's theory, the theorem, also known as "The Merton Rule", is a probable truth. His most noted work was Regulae Solvendi Sophismata (Rules for Solving Sophisms). Sophisma is a statement which one can argue to be both true and false. The resolution of these arguments and determination of the real state of affairs forces one to deal with logical matters such as the analysis of the meaning of the statement in question, and the application of logical rules to specific cases. An example would be the statement, "The compound H_{2}O is both a solid and a liquid". When the temperature is low enough this statement is true. But it may be argued and proven false at a higher temperature. In his time, this work was logically advanced. He was a second generation calculator. He built on Richard Klivingston's "Sophistimata and Bradwardine's "Insolubilia". Later, his work went on to influence Peter of Mantura and Paul of Venice.

=== Richard Swineshead ===
Richard Swineshead was also an English mathematician, logician, and natural philosopher. The sixteenth-century polymath Girolamo Cardano placed him in the top-ten intellects of all time, alongside Archimedes, Aristotle, and Euclid. He became a member of the Oxford calculators in 1344. His main work was a series of treatises written in 1350. This work earned him the title of "The Calculator". His treatises were named Liber Calculationum, which means "Book of Calculations". His book dealt in exhaustive detail with quantitative physics and he had over fifty variations of Bradwardine's law.

=== John Dumbleton ===
John Dumbleton became a member of the calculators in 1338–39. After becoming a member, he left the calculators for a brief period of time to study theology in Paris in 1345–47. After his study there he returned to his work with the calculators in 1347–48. One of his main pieces of work, Summa logicae et philosophiae naturalis, focused on explaining the natural world in a coherent and realistic manner, unlike some of his colleagues, claiming that they were making light of serious endeavors. Dumbleton attempted many solutions to the latitude of things, most were refuted by Richard Swineshead in his Liber Calculationum.

== See also ==
- Jean Buridan
- John Cantius
- Gerard of Brussels
- Henry of Langenstein
- Scholasticism
- Science in the Middle Ages
- Domingo de Soto
