= Insolubilia =

Variations on the liar paradox

In the Middle Ages, variations on the liar paradox were studied under the name of insolubilia ("insolubles").

== Overview ==
Although the liar paradox was well known in antiquity, interest seems to have lapsed until the twelfth century, when it appears to have been reinvented independently of ancient authors. Medieval interest may have been inspired by a passage in the Sophistical Refutations of Aristotle. Although the Sophistical Refutations are consistently cited by medieval logicians from the earliest insolubilia literature, medieval studies of insolubilia go well beyond Aristotle. Other ancient sources which could suggest the liar paradox, including Saint Augustine, Cicero, and the quotation of Epimenides appearing in the Epistle to Titus, were not cited in discussions of insolubilia.

Adam of Balsham mentioned, in passing, some paradoxical statements (dated to 1132), but he did not dwell on the difficulties raised by these statements. Alexander Neckham, writing later in the twelfth century, explicitly recognized the paradoxical nature of insolubilia, but did not attempt to resolve the inconsistent implications of the paradox. The first resolution was given by an anonymous author at the end of the twelfth or beginning of the thirteenth century. There was an established literature on the topic by about 1320, when Thomas Bradwardine prefaced his own discussion of insolubilia with nine views then current. Interest in insolubilia continued throughout the fourteenth century, especially by Jean Buridan.

The medieval insolubilia literature seems to treat these paradoxes as difficult but not truly "insoluble", and, though interesting and meriting investigation, not central to the study of logic. This may be contrasted with modern studies of self-referential paradoxes such as Russell's paradox, in which the problems are seen as fundamentally insoluble, and central to the foundations of logic.

== Bibliography ==
Thomas Bradwardine, Insolubilia (Insolubles), Latin text and English translation by Stephen Read, Leuven, Peeters Editions (Dallas Medieval Texts and Translations, 10), 2010.
