= Hooke–Newton inverse square law controversy =

In 1686, (Note: Dates in this article are given according to the Julian calendar, which was still in use in England at the time. Dates of events between 1 January and 24 March inclusive have an additional complication: formally the civil year began on 25 March although common practice then as now was to start the year on 1 January. Wikipedia follows the convention adopted by most modern historical writing of retaining the dates according to the Julian calendar but taking the year as starting on 1 January rather than 25 March. Some sources use the notation 16 85/86 for dates in January, February and March, to indicate both the legal year was still 1685 but the common year had advanced to 1686. For a more detailed explanation, see dual dating and Calendar (New Style) Act 1750.)) when the first book of Isaac Newton's Principia was presented to the Royal Society, Robert Hooke accused Newton of plagiarism by claiming that he had taken from him the "notion" of "the rule of the decrease of Gravity, being reciprocally as the squares of the distances from the Center". At the same time (according to Edmond Halley's contemporary report) Hooke agreed that "the Demonstration of the Curves generated thereby" was wholly Newton's.

The modern view is that the hypothesis of the inverse square relation was known before either Newton or Hooke came to be involved. Newton's work, by reasoning along multiple avenues and casting the relationship in mathematical terms, converted this hypothesis into an inverse square law, in modern terms a scientific theory, refined to the point of abstraction. Hooke's work lacked mathematical rigor and was inconsistent in its physical reasoning.

Newton gave credit in his Principia to two people: Ismaël Bullialdus (who wrote without proof that there was a force on the Earth towards the Sun), and Giovanni Alfonso Borelli (who wrote that all planets were attracted towards the Sun). The main influence may have been Borelli, whose book Newton had a copy of.

== Hooke's work and claims ==
Robert Hooke published his ideas about the "System of the World" in the 1660s, when he read to the Royal Society on March 21, 1666, a paper "concerning the inflection of a direct motion into a curve by a supervening attractive principle", and he published them again in somewhat developed form in 1674, as an addition to "An Attempt to Prove the Motion of the Earth from Observations". Hooke announced in 1674 that he planned to "explain a System of the World differing in many particulars from any yet known", based on three suppositions: that "all Celestial Bodies whatsoever, have an attraction or gravitating power towards their own Centers" and "also attract all the other Celestial Bodies that are within the sphere of their activity"; that "all bodies whatsoever that are put into a direct and simple motion, will so continue to move forward in a straight line, till they are by some other effectual powers deflected and bent..." and that "these attractive powers are so much the more powerful in operating, by how much the nearer the body wrought upon is to their own Centers". Thus Hooke postulated mutual attractions between the Sun and planets, in a way that increased with nearness to the attracting body, together with a principle of linear inertia.

Hooke's statements up to 1674 made no mention, however, that an inverse square law applies or might apply to these attractions. Hooke's gravitation was also not yet universal, though it approached universality more closely than previous hypotheses. He also did not provide accompanying evidence or mathematical demonstration. On the latter two aspects, Hooke himself stated in 1674: "Now what these several degrees [of attraction] are I have not yet experimentally verified"; and as to his whole proposal: "This I only hint at present", "having my self many other things in hand which I would first compleat, and therefore cannot so well attend it" (i.e. "prosecuting this Inquiry"). It was later on, in writing on 6 January 1680 to Newton, that Hooke communicated his "supposition ... that the Attraction always is in a duplicate proportion to the Distance from the Center Reciprocall, and Consequently that the Velocity will be in a subduplicate proportion to the Attraction and Consequently as Kepler Supposes Reciprocall to the Distance." (The inference about the velocity was incorrect.)

Hooke's correspondence with Newton during 1679–1680 not only mentioned this inverse square supposition for the decline of attraction with increasing distance, but also, in Hooke's opening letter to Newton, of 24 November 1679, an approach of "compounding the celestial motions of the planets of a direct motion by the tangent & an attractive motion towards the central body".

== Newton's work and claims ==
Newton, faced in May 1686 with Hooke's claim on the inverse square law, denied that Hooke was to be credited as author of the idea. Among the reasons, Newton recalled that the idea had been discussed with Sir Christopher Wren previous to Hooke's 1679 letter. Newton also pointed out and acknowledged prior work of others, including Ismaël Bullialdus, (who suggested, but without demonstration, that there was an attractive force from the Sun in the inverse square proportion to the distance), and Giovanni Alfonso Borelli (who suggested, also without demonstration, that there was a centrifugal tendency in counterbalance with a gravitational attraction towards the Sun so as to make the planets move in ellipses). Tom Whiteside has described the contribution to Newton's thinking that came from Borelli's book, a copy of which was in Newton's library at his death.

Newton further defended his work by saying that had he first heard of the inverse square proportion from Hooke, he would still have some rights to it in view of his demonstrations of its accuracy. Hooke, without evidence in favor of the supposition, could only guess that the inverse square law was approximately valid at great distances from the center. According to Newton, while the 'Principia' was still at pre-publication stage, there were so many a priori reasons to doubt the accuracy of the inverse-square law (especially close to an attracting sphere) that "without my (Newton's) Demonstrations, to which Mr Hooke is yet a stranger, it cannot believed by a judicious Philosopher to be any where accurate."

This remark refers among other things to Newton's finding, supported by mathematical demonstration, that if the inverse square law applies to tiny particles, then even a large spherically symmetrical mass also attracts masses external to its surface, even close up, exactly as if all its own mass were concentrated at its center. Thus Newton gave a justification, otherwise lacking, for applying the inverse square law to large spherical planetary masses as if they were tiny particles. In addition, Newton had formulated, in Propositions 43–45 of Book 1 and associated sections of Book 3, a sensitive test of the accuracy of the inverse square law, in which he showed that only where the law of force is calculated as the inverse square of the distance will the directions of orientation of the planets' orbital ellipses stay constant as they are observed to do apart from small effects attributable to inter-planetary perturbations.

In regard to evidence that still survives of the earlier history, manuscripts written by Newton in the 1660s show that Newton himself had, by 1669, arrived at proofs that in a circular case of planetary motion, "endeavour to recede" (what was later called centrifugal force) had an inverse-square relation with distance from the center. After his 1679–1680 correspondence with Hooke, Newton adopted the language of inward or centripetal force. According to Newton scholar J. Bruce Brackenridge, although much has been made of the change in language and difference of point of view, as between centrifugal or centripetal forces, the actual computations and proofs remained the same either way. They also involved the combination of tangential and radial displacements, which Newton was making in the 1660s. The lesson offered by Hooke to Newton here, although significant, was one of perspective and did not change the analysis. This background shows there was basis for Newton to deny deriving the inverse square law from Hooke.

== Newton's acknowledgment ==
On the other hand, Newton did accept and acknowledge, in all editions of the Principia, that Hooke (but not exclusively Hooke) had separately appreciated the inverse square law in the Solar System. Newton acknowledged Wren, Hooke, and Halley in this connection in the Scholium to Proposition 4 in Book 1. Newton also acknowledged to Halley that his correspondence with Hooke in 1679–80 had reawakened his dormant interest in astronomical matters, but that did not mean, according to Newton, that Hooke had told Newton anything new or original: "yet am I not beholden to him for any light into that business but only for the diversion he gave me from my other studies to think on these things & for his dogmaticalness in writing as if he had found the motion in the Ellipsis, which inclined me to try it ..."

While Newton acknowledged Wren, Halley, and Hooke in his Principia, this is regarded as having been generous, since he could have cited his own work from 1666. Additionally, he is considered modest for not explicitly stating that his new and refined universal law completely superseded all previous attempts at inverse-square law relationships.

== Modern priority controversy ==
Since the time of Newton and Hooke, scholarly discussion has also touched on the question of whether Hooke's 1679 mention of 'compounding the motions' provided Newton with something new and valuable, even though that was not a claim actually voiced by Hooke at the time. As described above, Newton's manuscripts of the 1660s do show him actually combining tangential motion with the effects of radially directed force or endeavour, for example in his derivation of the inverse square relation for the circular case. They also show Newton clearly expressing the concept of linear inertia—for which he was indebted to René Descartes' work, published in 1644 (as Hooke probably was). These matters do not appear to have been learned by Newton from Hooke.

Nevertheless, a number of authors have had more to say about what Newton gained from Hooke and some aspects remain controversial. A modern assessment of the early history of the inverse square law is that the idea had been discussed before Newton and Hooke. Hooke's significant contributions may have been the idea of "compounding the celestial motions," and for the conversion of Newton's thinking away from "centrifugal" and towards "centripetal" force. Most of Hooke's private papers had been destroyed or have disappeared making research on his side of the debate more difficult.

The critical aspect of Newton's work, not present in Hooke's work, was to show how the inverse-square law of attraction had many necessary mathematical connections with observable features of the motions of bodies in the solar system; and that they were related in such a way that the observational evidence and the mathematical demonstrations, taken together, gave reason to believe that the inverse square law was not just approximately true but exactly true (to the accuracy achievable in Newton's time and for about two centuries afterwards – and with some loose ends of points that could not yet be certainly examined, where the implications of the theory had not yet been adequately identified or calculated). Hooke's work not only lacked mathematical rigor, but was also physically wrong in its applications.

About thirty years after Newton's death in 1727, Alexis Clairaut, a mathematical astronomer eminent in his own right in the field of gravitational studies, wrote after reviewing what Hooke published, that "One must not think that this idea ... of Hooke diminishes Newton's glory"; and that "the example of Hooke" serves "to show what a distance there is between a truth that is glimpsed and a truth that is demonstrated".
