= De Gradibus =

9th-century book by Al-Kindi

- Author: Al-Kindi
- Original title: رسالة في قدر منفعة صناعة الطب

De Gradibus was an Arabic book published by the Arab physician Al-Kindi (c. 801–873 CE). De gradibus is the Latinized name of the book. An alternative name for the book was Quia Primos.

In De Gradibus, Al-Kindi attempts to apply mathematics to pharmacology by quantifying the strength of drugs. According to Prioreschi, this was the first attempt at serious quantification in medicine. During the Arabic-Latin translation movement of the 12th century, De Gradibus was translated into Latin by Gerard of Cremona. Al-Kindi's mathematical reasoning was complex and hard to follow; Roger Bacon commented that his method of computing the strength of a drug was extremely difficult to use.
