= Nicole Oresme =

French philosopher (1325–1382)

The Most Reverend Nicole Oresme
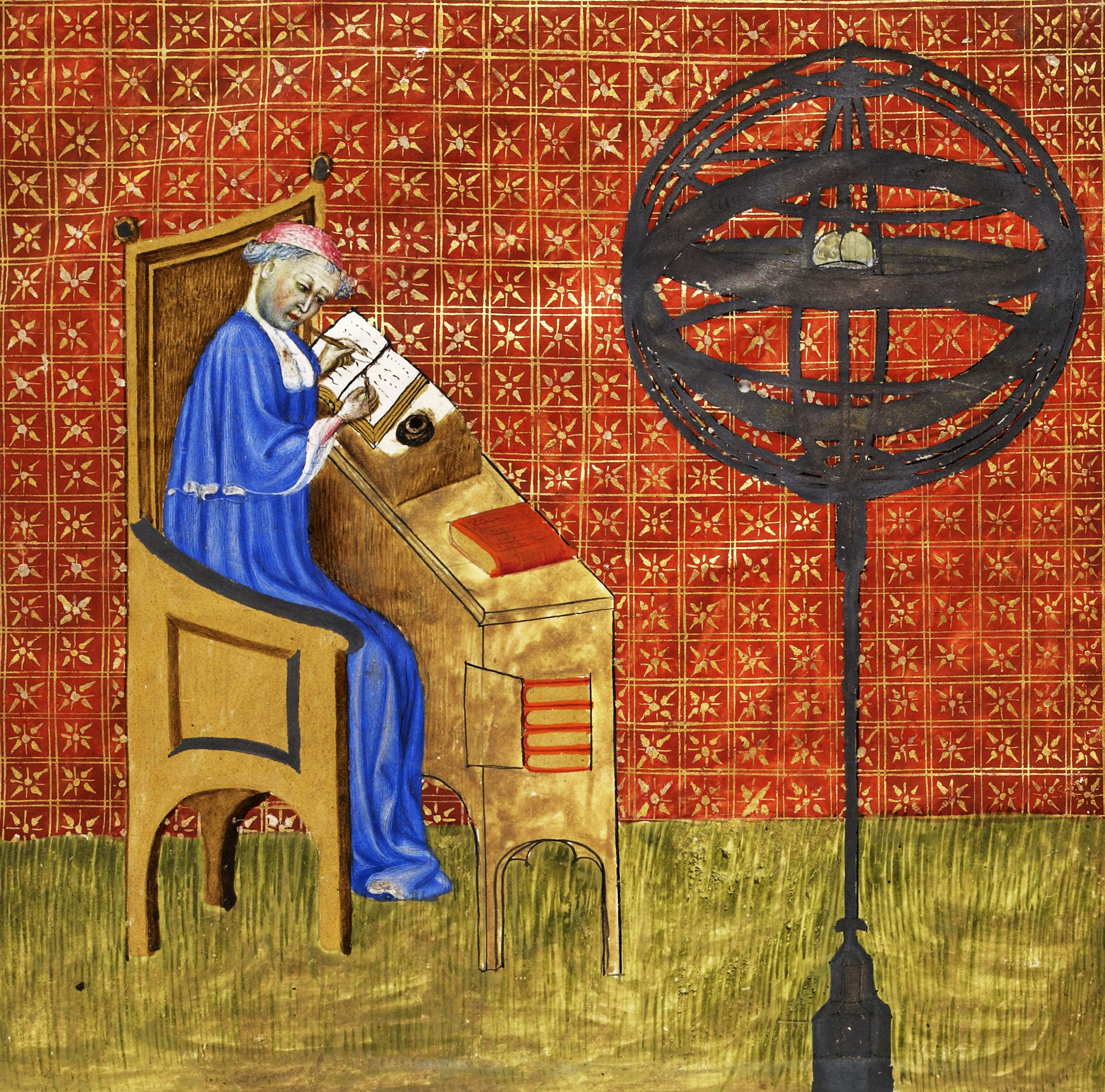
- Portrait of Nicole Oresme: Miniature from Oresme's Traité de l'espère, Bibliothèque Nationale, Paris, France, fonds français 565, fol. 1r.
- Born: 1325; Fleury-sur-Orne, Normandy, Kingdom of France
- Died: 11 July 1382; Lisieux, Normandy, France

Education
- Education: College of Navarre (University of Paris)

Philosophical work
- Era: Medieval philosophy
- Region: Western philosophy
- School: Scholasticism; Nominalism
- Institutions: College of Navarre (University of Paris)
- Main interests: Natural philosophy, astronomy, theology, mathematics
- Notable ideas: Rectangular co-ordinates, first proof of the divergence of the harmonic series, mean speed theorem

Nicole Oresme (/ɔːˈrɛm/; French: [nikɔl ɔʁɛm]; c. 1325 – 11 July 1382), also known as Nicolas Oresme, Nicholas Oresme, or Nicolas d'Oresme, was a French philosopher of the later Middle Ages. He wrote influential works on economics, mathematics, physics, astrology, astronomy, philosophy, and theology. He was Bishop of Lisieux, a translator, a counselor of King Charles V of France, and one of the most original thinkers of 14th-century Europe.

== Life ==
Nicole Oresme was born c. 1320–1325 in the village of Allemagne (today's Fleury-sur-Orne) in the vicinity of Caen, Normandy, in the diocese of Bayeux. Practically nothing is known concerning his family. The fact that Oresme attended the royally sponsored and subsidised College of Navarre, an institution for students too poor to pay their expenses while studying at the University of Paris, makes it probable that he came from a peasant family.

Oresme studied the "arts" in Paris, together with Jean Buridan (the so-called founder of the French school of natural philosophy), Albert of Saxony and perhaps Marsilius of Inghen, and there received the Magister Artium. He was already a regent master in arts by 1342, during the crisis over William of Ockham's natural philosophy.

In 1348, he was a student of theology in Paris.

In 1356 he received his doctorate and in the same year he became grand master (grand-maître) of the College of Navarre.

In 1364 he was appointed dean of the Cathedral of Rouen. Around 1369, he began a series of translations of Aristotelian works at the request of Charles V, who granted him a pension in 1371 and, with royal support, was appointed bishop of Lisieux in 1377. In 1382, he died in Lisieux.

== Scientific work ==
=== Cosmology ===
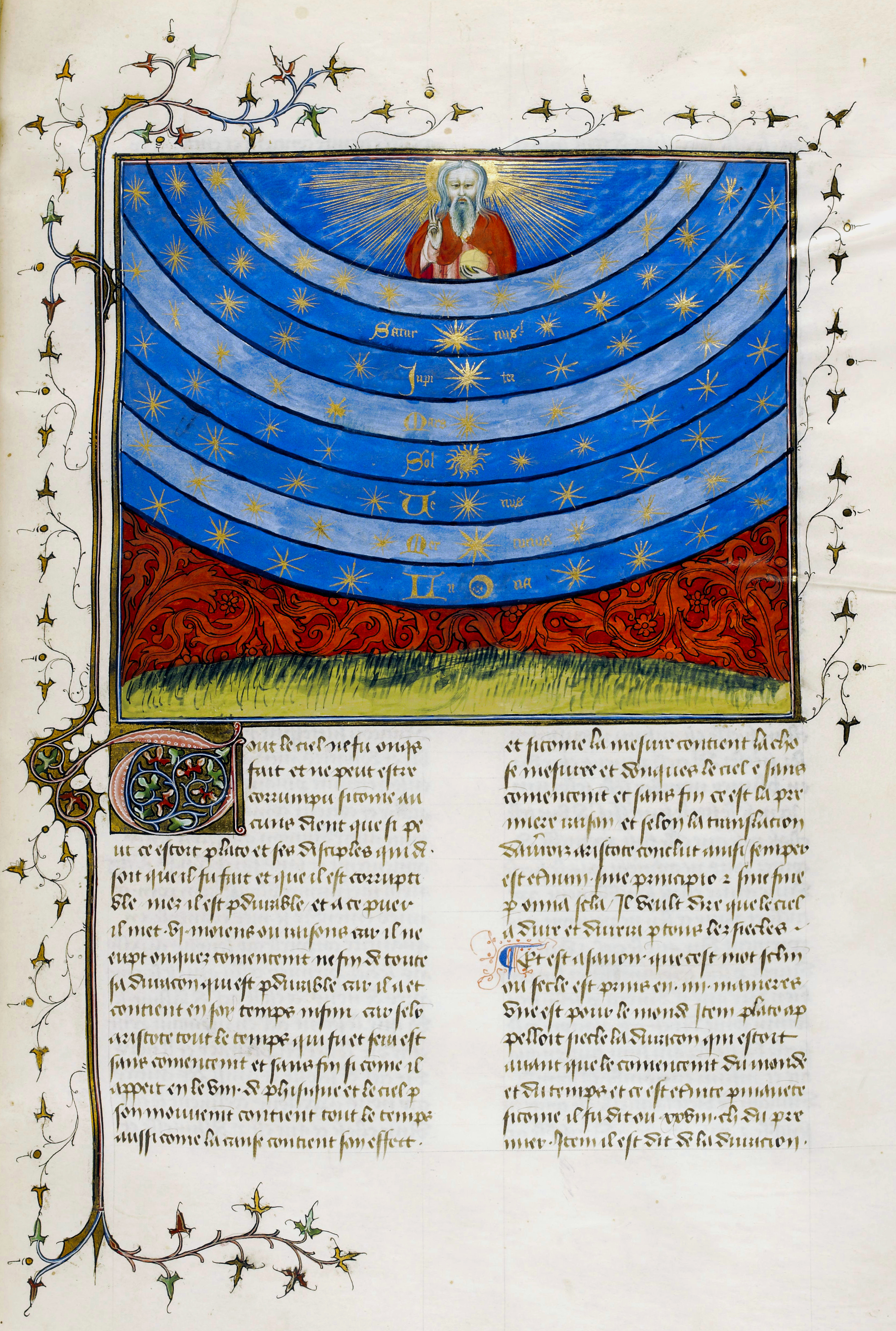
A page from Oresme's Livre du ciel et du monde, 1377, showing the celestial spheres

In his Livre du ciel et du monde Oresme discussed a range of evidence for and against the daily rotation of the Earth on its axis. From astronomical considerations, he maintained that if the Earth were moving and not the celestial spheres, all the movements that we see in the heavens that are computed by the astronomers would appear exactly the same as if the spheres were rotating around the Earth. He rejected the physical argument that if the Earth were moving the air would be left behind causing a great wind from east to west. In his view the Earth, Water, and Air would all share the same motion. As to the scriptural passage that speaks of the motion of the Sun, he concludes that "this passage conforms to the customary usage of popular speech" and is not to be taken literally. He also noted that it would be more economical for the small Earth to rotate on its axis than the immense sphere of the stars. Nonetheless, he concluded that none of these arguments were conclusive and "everyone maintains, and I think myself, that the heavens do move and not the Earth."

=== Critiques of astrology ===
In his mathematical work, Oresme developed the notion of incommensurate fractions, fractions that could not be expressed as powers of one another, and made probabilistic, statistical arguments as to their relative frequency. From this, he argued that it was very probable that the length of the day and the year were incommensurate (irrational), as indeed were the periods of the motions of the moon and the planets. From this, he noted that planetary conjunctions and oppositions would never recur in quite exactly the same way. Oresme maintained that this disproves the claims of astrologers who, thinking "they know with punctual exactness the motions, aspects, conjunctions and oppositions... [judge] rashly and erroneously about future events."

Oresme's critique of astrology in his Livre de divinacions treats it as having six parts. The first, essentially astronomy, the movements of heavenly bodies, he considers good science but not precisely knowable. The second part deals with the influences of the heavenly bodies on earthly events at all scales. Oresme does not deny such influence, but states, in line with a commonly held opinion, that it could either be that arrangements of heavenly bodies signify events, purely symbolically, or that they actually cause such events, deterministically. Mediaevalist Chauncey Wood remarks that this major elision "makes it very difficult to determine who believed what about astrology".

The third part concerns predictiveness, covering events at three different scales: great events such as plagues, famines, floods and wars; weather, winds and storms; and medicine, with influences on the humours, the four Aristotelian fluids of the body. Oresme criticizes all of these as misdirected, though he accepts that prediction is a legitimate area of study, and argues that the effect on the weather is less well known than the effect on great events. He observes that sailors and farmers are better at predicting weather than astrologers, and specifically attacks the astrological basis of prediction, noting correctly that the zodiac has moved relative to the fixed stars (because of precession of the equinoxes) since the zodiac was first described in ancient times. These first three parts are what Oresme considers the physical influences of the stars and planets (including sun and moon) on the earth, and while he offers critiques of them, he accepts that effects exist. The last three parts are what Oresme considers to concern (good or bad) fortune. They are interrogations, meaning asking the stars when to do things such as business deals; elections, meaning choosing the best time to do things such as getting married or fighting a war and nativities, meaning the natal astrology with birth charts that forms much of modern astrological practice. Oresme classifies interrogations and elections as "totally false" arts, but his critique of nativities is more measured. He denies that any path is predetermined by the heavenly bodies, because humans have free will, but he accepts that the heavenly bodies can influence behaviour and habitual mood, via the combination of humours in each person. Overall, Oresme's skepticism is strongly shaped by his understanding of the scope of astrology. He accepts things a modern skeptic would reject, and rejects some things – such as the knowability of planetary movements, and effects on weather – that are accepted by modern science.

=== Sense perception ===
In discussing the propagation of light and sound, Oresme adopted the common medieval doctrine of the multiplication of species, as it had been developed by optical writers such as Alhacen, Robert Grosseteste, Roger Bacon, John Pecham, and Witelo. Oresme maintained that these species were immaterial, but corporeal (i.e., three-dimensional) entities.

=== Mathematics ===
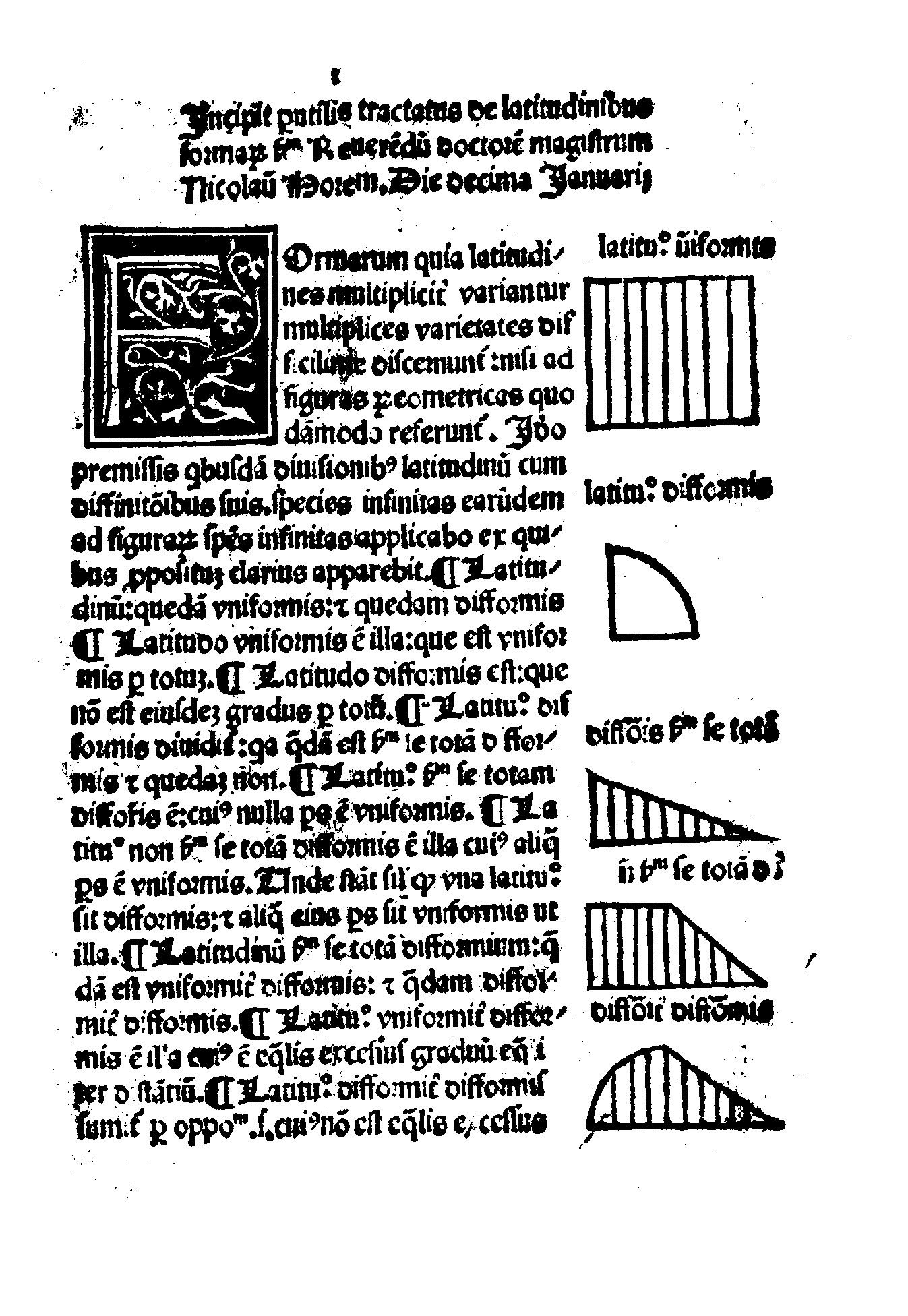
De latitudinibus formarum, 1486

Oresme's most important contributions to mathematics are contained in Tractatus de configurationibus qualitatum et motuum. In a quality, or accidental form, such as heat, he distinguished the intensio (the degree of heat at each point) and the extensio (as the length of the heated rod). These two terms were often replaced by latitudo and longitudo. For the sake of clarity, Oresme conceived the idea of visualizing these concepts by plane figures, approaching what we would now call rectangular coordinates. The intensity of the quality was represented by a length or latitudo proportional to the intensity erected perpendicular to the base at a given point on the base line, which represents the longitudo. Oresme proposed that the geometrical form of such a figure could be regarded as corresponding to a characteristic of the quality itself. Oresme defined a uniform quality as that which is represented by a line parallel to the longitude, and any other quality as difform. Uniformly varying qualities are represented by a straight line inclined to the axis of the longitude, while he described many cases of nonuniformly varying qualities. Oresme extended this doctrine to figures of three dimensions. He considered this analysis applicable to many different qualities such as hotness, whiteness, and sweetness. Significantly for later developments, Oresme applied this concept to the analysis of local motion where the latitudo or intensity represented the speed, the longitudo represented the time, and the area of the figure represented the distance travelled.

He shows that his method of figuring the latitude of forms is applicable to the movement of a point, on condition that the time is taken as longitude and the speed as latitude; quantity is, then, the space covered in a given time. In virtue of this transposition, the theorem of the latitudo uniformiter difformis became the law of the space traversed in case of uniformly varied motion; thus Oresme published what was taught over two centuries prior to Galileo's making it famous. Diagrams of the velocity of an accelerating object against time in On the Latitude of Forms by Oresme have been cited to credit Oresme with the discovery of "proto bar charts".

In De configurationibus Oresme introduces the concept of curvature as a measure of departure from straightness, for circles he has the curvature as being inversely proportional to radius and attempts to extend this to other curves as a continuously varying magnitude.

Significantly, Oresme developed the first proof of the divergence of the harmonic series. His proof, requiring less advanced mathematics than current standard tests for divergence (for example, the integral test), begins by noting that for any n that is a power of 2, there are n/2 − 1 terms in the series between 1/(n/2) and 1/n. Each of these terms is at least 1/n, and since there are n/2 of them they sum to at least 1/2. For instance, there is one term 1/2, then two terms 1/3 + 1/4 that together sum to at least 1/2, then four terms 1/5 + 1/6 + 1/7 + 1/8 that also sum to at least 1/2, and so on. Thus the series must be greater than the series 1 + 1/2 + 1/2 + 1/2 + ..., which does not have a finite limit. This proves that the harmonic series must be divergent. This argument shows that the sum of the first n terms grows at least as fast as $(1/2) \log_2 n$. (See also Harmonic series)

Oresme was the first mathematician to prove this fact, and (after his proof was lost) it was not proven again until the 17th century by Pietro Mengoli.

He also worked on fractional powers, and the notion of probability over infinite sequences, ideas which would not be further developed for the next three and five centuries, respectively.

=== On local motion ===
Oresme, like many of his contemporaries such as John Buridan and Albert of Saxony, shaped and critiqued Aristotle's and Averroes's theories of motion to his own liking. Taking inspiration from the theories of forma fluens and fluxus formae, Oresme would suggest his own descriptions for change and motion in his commentary of Physics. Forma fluens is described by William of Ockham as "Every thing that is moved is moved by a mover," and fluxus formae as "Every motion is produced by a mover." Buridan and Albert of Saxony each subscribed to the classic interpretation of flux being an innate part of an object, but Oresme differs from his contemporaries in this aspect. Oresme agrees with fluxus formae in that motion is attributed to an object, but that an object is "set into" motion, rather than "given" motion, denying a distinction between a motionless object and an object in motion. To Oresme, an object moves, but it is not a moving object. Once an object begins movement through the three dimensions it has a new "modus rei" or "way of being," which should only be described through the perspective of the moving object, rather than a distinct point. This line of thought coincides with Oresme's challenge to the structure of the universe. Oresme's description of motion was not popular, although it was thorough. A Richard Brinkley is thought to be an inspiration for the modus-rei description, but this is uncertain.

=== Political thought ===
Oresme provided the first modern vernacular translations of Aristotle's moral works that are still extant today. Between 1371 and 1377 he translated Aristotle's Ethics, Politics and Economics (the last of which is nowadays considered to be pseudo-Aristotelian) into Middle French. He also extensively commented on these texts, thereby expressing some of his political views. Like his predecessors Albert the Great, Thomas Aquinas and Peter of Auvergne (and quite unlike Aristotle), Oresme favours monarchy as the best form of government. His criterion for good government is the common good. A king (by definition good) takes care of the common good, whereas a tyrant works for his own profit. A monarch can ensure the stability and durability of his reign by letting the people participate in government. This has rather confusingly and anachronistically been called popular sovereignty. Like Albert the Great, Thomas Aquinas, Peter of Auvergne and especially Marsilius of Padua, whom he occasionally quotes, Oresme conceives of this popular participation as rather restrictive: only the multitude of reasonable, wise and virtuous men should be allowed political participation by electing and correcting the prince, changing the law and passing judgement. Oresme, however, categorically denies the right of rebellion since it endangers the common good. Unlike earlier commentators, however, Oresme prescribes the law as superior to the king's will. It must only be changed in cases of extreme necessity. Oresme favours moderate kingship, thereby negating contemporary absolutist thought, usually promoted by adherents of Roman law. Furthermore, Oresme doesn't comply to contemporary conceptions of the French king as sacred, as promoted by Évrart de Trémaugon in his Songe du vergier or Jean Golein in his Traité du sacre. Although he heavily criticises the Church as corrupt, tyrannical and oligarchical, he never fundamentally questions its necessity for the spiritual well-being of the faithful.

It has traditionally been thought that Oresme's Aristotelian translations had a major influence on King Charles V's politics: Charles' laws concerning the line of succession and the possibility of a regency for an underage king have been accredited to Oresme, as has the election of several high-ranking officials by the king's council in the early 1370s. Oresme may have conveyed Marsilian and conciliarist thought to Jean Gerson and Christine de Pizan.

=== Economics ===
With his Treatise on the origin, nature, law, and alterations of money (De origine, natura, jure et mutationibus monetarum), one of the earliest manuscripts devoted to an economic matter, Oresme brings an interesting insight on the medieval conception of money. Oresme's viewpoints of theoretical architecture are outlined in Part 3 and 4 of his work from De moneta, which he completed between 1356 and 1360. His belief is that humans have a natural right to own property; this property belongs to the individual and community. In Part 4, Oresme provides a solution to a political problem as to how a monarch can be held accountable to put the common good before any private affairs. Though the monarchy rightfully has claims on all money given an emergency, Oresme states that any ruler that goes through this is a "Tyrant dominating slaves". Oresme was one of the first medieval theorists that did not accept the right of the monarch to have claims on all money as well as "his subjects' right to own private property."

=== Psychology ===
Oresme was known to be a well rounded psychologist. He practiced the technique of "inner senses" and studied the perception of the world. Oresme contributed to 19th and 20th century psychology in the fields of cognitive psychology, perception psychology, psychology of consciousness, and psychophysics. Oresme discovered the psychology of unconscious and came up with the theory of unconscious conclusion of perception. He developed many ideas beyond quality, quantity, categories and terms which were labeled "theory of cognition".

== Posthumous reputation ==
Oresme's economic thought remained well regarded centuries after his death. In a 1920 Essay on Medieval Economic Teaching, Irish economist George O'Brien summed up the favorable academic consensus over Oresme's Treatise on the origin, nature, law, and alterations of money:

The merits of this work have excited the unanimous admiration of all who have studied it. Roscher says that it contains 'a theory of money, elaborated in the fourteenth century, which remains perfectly correct to-day, under the test of the principles applied in the nineteenth century, and that with a brevity, a precision, a clarity, and a simplicity of language which is a striking proof of the superior genius of its author.' According to Brants, 'the treatise of Oresme is one of the first to be devoted ex professo to an economic subject, and it expresses many ideas which are very just, more just than those which held the field for a long period after him, under the name of mercantilism, and more just than those which allowed of the reduction of money as if it were nothing more than a counter of exchange.' 'Oresme's treatise on money,' says Macleod, 'may be justly said to stand at the head of modern economic literature. This treatise laid the foundations of monetary science, which are now accepted by all sound economists.' 'Oresme's completely secular and naturalistic method of treating one of the most important problems of political economy,' says Espinas, 'is a signal of the approaching end of the Middle Ages and the dawn of the Renaissance.' Dr. Cunningham adds his tribute of praise: 'The conceptions of national wealth and national power were ruling ideas in economic matters for several centuries, and Oresme appears to be the earliest of the economic writers by whom they were explicitly adopted as the very basis of his argument.... A large number of points of economic doctrine in regard to coinage are discussed with much judgment and clearness.' Endemann alone is inclined to quarrel with the pre-eminence of Oresme; but on this question, he is in a minority of one.

== Authenticity of the Shroud of Turin ==
Oresme like many who were skeptical of the Shroud of Turin during the medieval period, considered it to be a complete forgery. His thoughts on the relic are found in his treatise called "Problemata" (1370–1392).

== Selected works in English translation ==
- Nicole Oresme's De visione stellarum (On seeing the stars): a critical edition of Oresme's treatise on optics and atmospheric refraction, translated by Dan Burton, (Leiden; Boston: Brill, 2007, ISBN 9789004153707)
- Nicole Oresme and the marvels of nature: a study of his De causis mirabilium, translated by Bert Hansen, (Toronto: Pontifical Institute of Mediaeval Studies, 1985, ISBN 9780888440686)
- Questiones super quatuor libros meteororum, in SC McCluskey, ed, Nicole Oresme on Light, Color and the Rainbow: An Edition and Translation, with introduction and critical notes, of Part of Book Three of his Questiones super quatuor libros meteororum (PhD dissertation, University of Wisconsin, 1974, Google Books)
- Nicole Oresme and the kinematics of circular motion: Tractatus de commensurabilitate vel incommensurabilitate motuum celi, translated by Edward Grant, (Madison: University of Wisconsin Press, 1971)
- Nicole Oresme and the medieval geometry of qualities and motions: a treatise on the uniformity and difformity of intensities known as Tractatus de configurationibus qualitatum et motuum, translated by Marshall Clagett, (Madison: University of Wisconsin Press, 1971, OCLC 894)
- Le Livre du ciel et du monde. A. D. Menut and A. J. Denomy, ed. and trans. (Madison: University of Wisconsin Press, 1968, ISBN 9780783797878)
- De proportionibus proportionum and Ad pauca respicientes. Edward Grant, ed. and trans. (Madison: University of Wisconsin Press, 1966, ISBN 9780299040000)
- The De moneta of N. Oresme, and English Mint documents, translated by C. Johnson, (London, 1956)

== See also ==
- Henry of Langenstein
- List of multiple discoveries
- List of Roman Catholic scientist-clerics
- Oresme (crater)
- Science in the Middle Ages
