= Wilhelm Endemann =

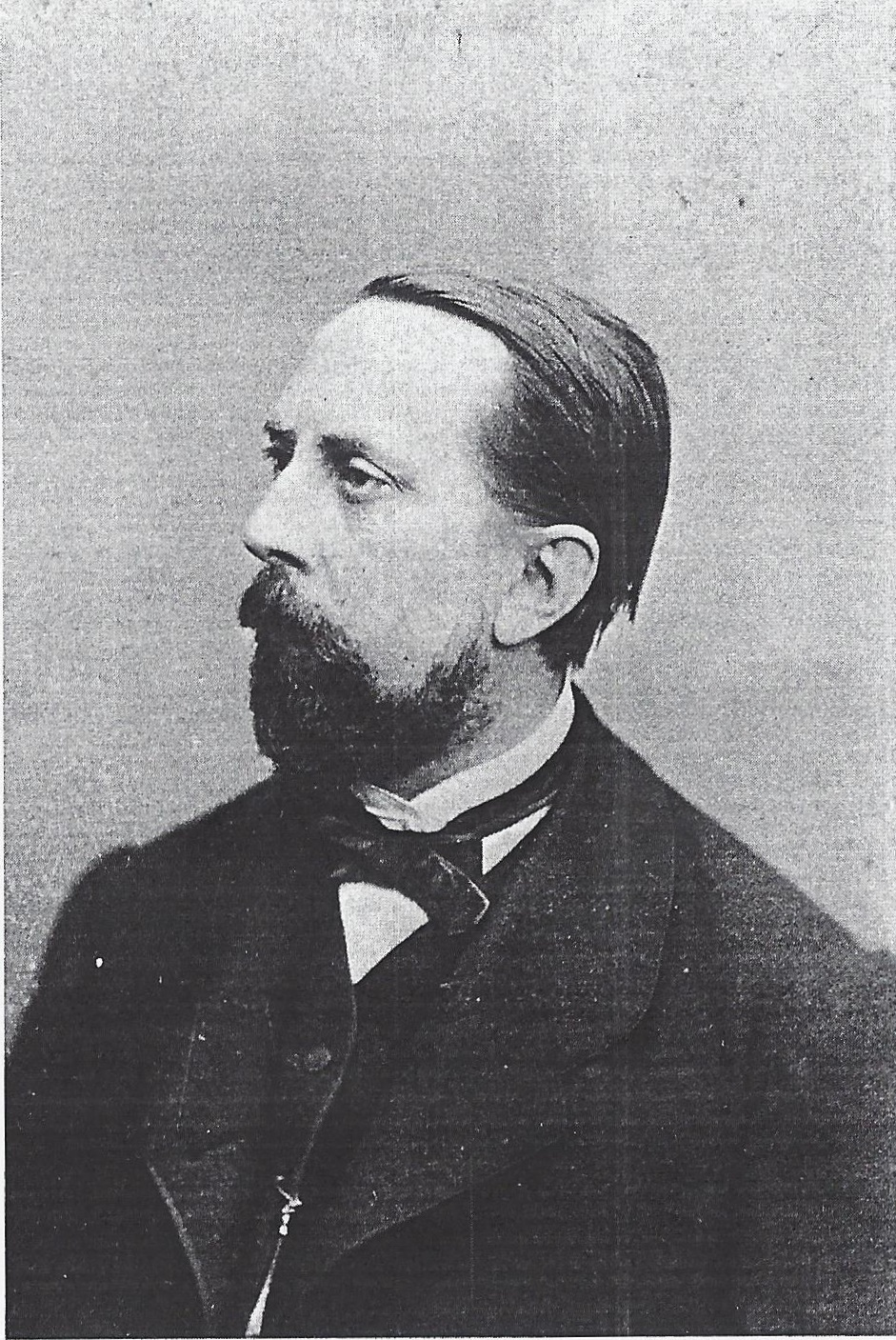
Wilhelm Endemann

Wilhelm Endemann (24 April 1825, in Marburg – 13 June 1899, in Cassel) was a German jurist.

== Biography ==
The parents of Endemanns were the jurist Konrad Endemann and his wife Charlotte Wilhelmine née Grau. A brother was Friedrich Carl Endemann, Vice-mayor of Kassel and member of Reichstag. In 1856 he married Katinka Pult in Fulda. One son was Friedrich Endemann (1857–1936).

He was educated at the universities of Marburg and Heidelberg, became a professor of law at the University of Jena in 1862, then later assumed the same position at the University of Bonn in 1875. From 1871 to 1873 he was a member of the Reichstag. He became one of the greatest authorities on the commercial law of Germany.

== Works ==
His works on jurisprudence include:

- Der Entwurf eines deutschen Handelsgesetzbuchs (1858).
- Das deutsche Handelsrecht (German commercial law, 4th edition 1887).
- Die Entwicklung des Beweisverfahrens im deutschen Civilprozess (1895).
