= Mean speed theorem =

Theory of speed in physics

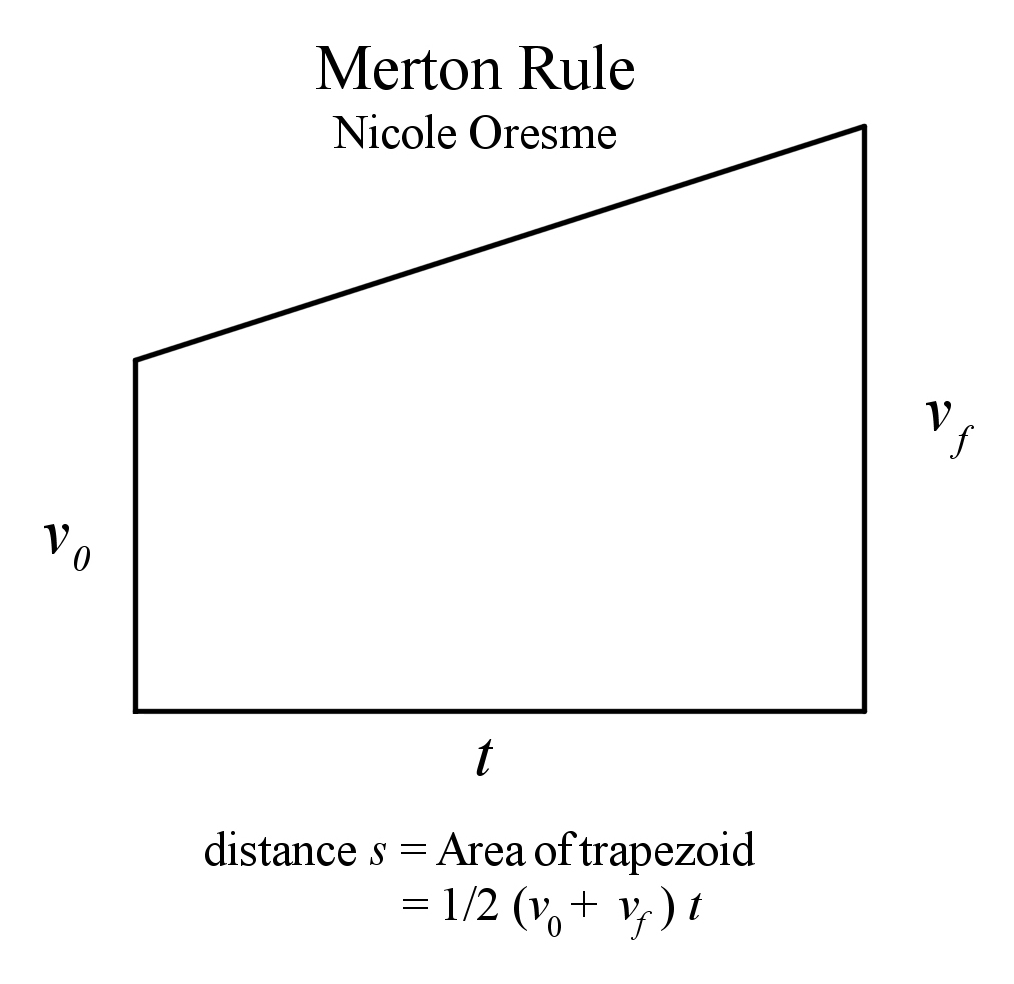
Oresme's geometric verification of the Oxford Calculators' Merton Rule of uniform acceleration, or mean speed theorem.

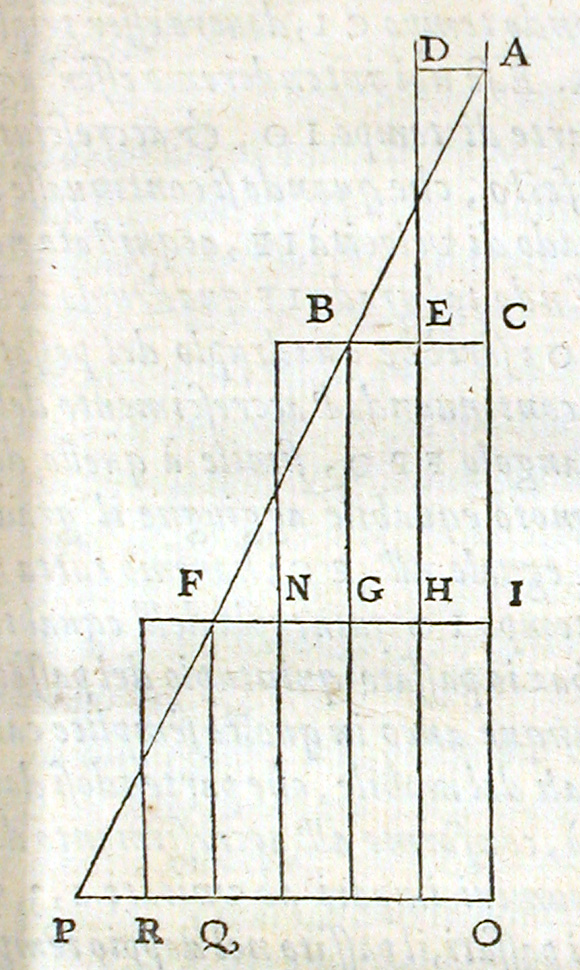
Galileo's demonstration of the law of the space traversed in case of uniformly varied motion. It is the same demonstration that Oresme had made centuries earlier.

The mean speed theorem, also known as the Merton rule of uniform acceleration, was discovered in the 14th century by the Oxford Calculators of Merton College, and was proved by Nicole Oresme. It states that a uniformly accelerated body (starting from rest, i.e. zero initial velocity) travels the same distance as a body with uniform speed whose speed is half the final velocity of the accelerated body.

== Details ==
Oresme provided a geometrical verification for the generalized Merton rule, which we would express today as $s = \frac{1}{2}(v_0 + v_{\rm f})t$ (i.e., distance traveled is equal to one half of the sum of the initial $v_0$ and final $v_{\rm f}$ velocities, multiplied by the elapsed time $t$), by finding the area of a trapezoid. Clay tablets used in Babylonian astronomy (350–50 BC) present trapezoid procedures for computing Jupiter's position and motion.

The medieval scientists demonstrated this theorem—the foundation of "the law of falling bodies"—long before Galileo, who is generally credited with it. Oresme's proof is also the first known example of the modelization of a physical problem as a mathematical function with a graphical representation, as well as of an early form of integration. The mathematical physicist and historian of science Clifford Truesdell, wrote:

The now published sources prove to us, beyond contention, that the main kinematical properties of uniformly accelerated motions, still attributed to Galileo by the physics texts, were discovered and proved by scholars of Merton college.... In principle, the qualities of Greek physics were replaced, at least for motions, by the numerical quantities that have ruled Western science ever since. The work was quickly diffused into France, Italy, and other parts of Europe. Almost immediately, Giovanni di Casale and Nicole Oresme found how to represent the results by geometrical graphs, introducing the connection between geometry and the physical world that became a second characteristic habit of Western thought ...

The theorem is a special case of the more general kinematics equations for uniform acceleration.

== See also ==
- Science in the Middle Ages
- Scholasticism
- Mean value theorem
