= Giovanni di Casali =

Italian mathematician and theologian

Giovanni (or Johannes) di Casali (or da Casale; c. 1320 – after 1374) was a friar in the Franciscan Order, a natural philosopher and a theologian, author of works on theology and science, and a papal legate.

He was born in Casale Monferrato around 1320 and entered the Franciscan order in the Genoese province. He was lecturer in the Franciscan stadium at Assisi from 1335 to 1340. He subsequently was lector at Cambridge ca. 1340 to 1341, where he encountered the mathematical physics developed by the Oxford Calculators. He was also an inquisitor in Florence, and a lector in Bologna from 1346 to ca. 1352. In 1375 Pope Gregory XI appointed him papal legate to the court of King Frederick of Sicily.

About 1346 he wrote a treatise De velocitate motus alterationis (On the Velocity of the Motion of Alteration) which was subsequently printed in Venice in 1505. In it he presented a graphical analysis of the motion of accelerated bodies. His teachings in mathematical physics influenced scholars at the University of Padua and, it is believed, may have ultimately influenced the similar ideas presented over two centuries later by Galileo Galilei.

== See also ==
- List of Roman Catholic scientist-clerics
