= William of Heytesbury =

English philosopher and logician

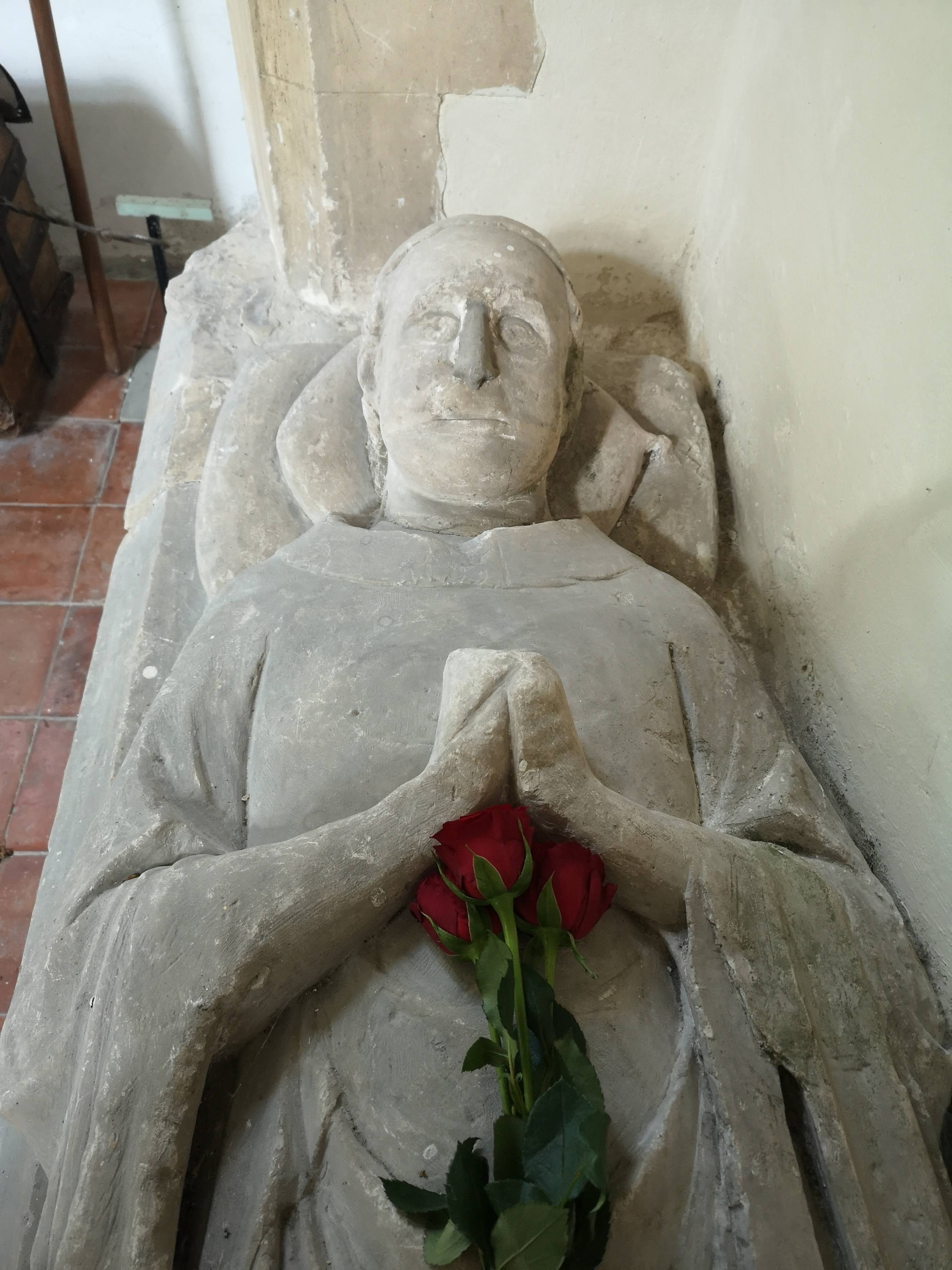

William of Heytesbury, or William Heytesbury, or William de Heytisbury, called in Latin Guglielmus Hentisberus or Tisberus (c. 1313 – 1372/1373), was an English philosopher and logician, best known as one of the Oxford Calculators of Merton College, Oxford, where he was a fellow.

== Life ==
Heytesbury had become a fellow of Merton by 1330. In his work he applied logical techniques to the problems of divisibility, the continuum, and kinematics. His magnum opus was the Regulae solvendi sophismata (Rules for Solving Sophisms), written about 1335.

He was Chancellor of the University of Oxford for the year 1371 to 1372.

== Works ==
- 1335 - Regulae solvendi sophismata (Rules for Solving Sophisms)
  - 1. On insoluble sentences
  - 2. On knowing and doubting
  - 3. On relative terms
  - 4. On beginning and ceasing
  - 5. On maxima and minima
  - 6. On the three categories (De tribus praedicamentis)
- 1483 - De probationibus conclusionum tractatus regularum solvendi sophismata (On the Proofs of Conclusions from the Treatise of Rules for Resolving Syllogisms) - Pavia
- Liber Calculationum

== Notes ==
Academic offices
Preceded by Adam de Toneworth	Chancellor of the University of Oxford; 1371–1372	Succeeded by William de Remmyngton
