= Richard Swineshead =

English mathematician, logician, and natural philosopher (fl. c. 1340–1354)

Richard Swineshead (also Suisset, Suiseth, etc.; fl. c. 1340 – 1354) was an English mathematician, logician, and natural philosopher. He was perhaps the greatest of the Oxford Calculators of Merton College, where he was a fellow certainly by 1344 and possibly by 1340. His magnum opus was a series of treatises known as the Liber calculationum ("Book of Calculations"), written c. 1350, which earned him the nickname of The Calculator.

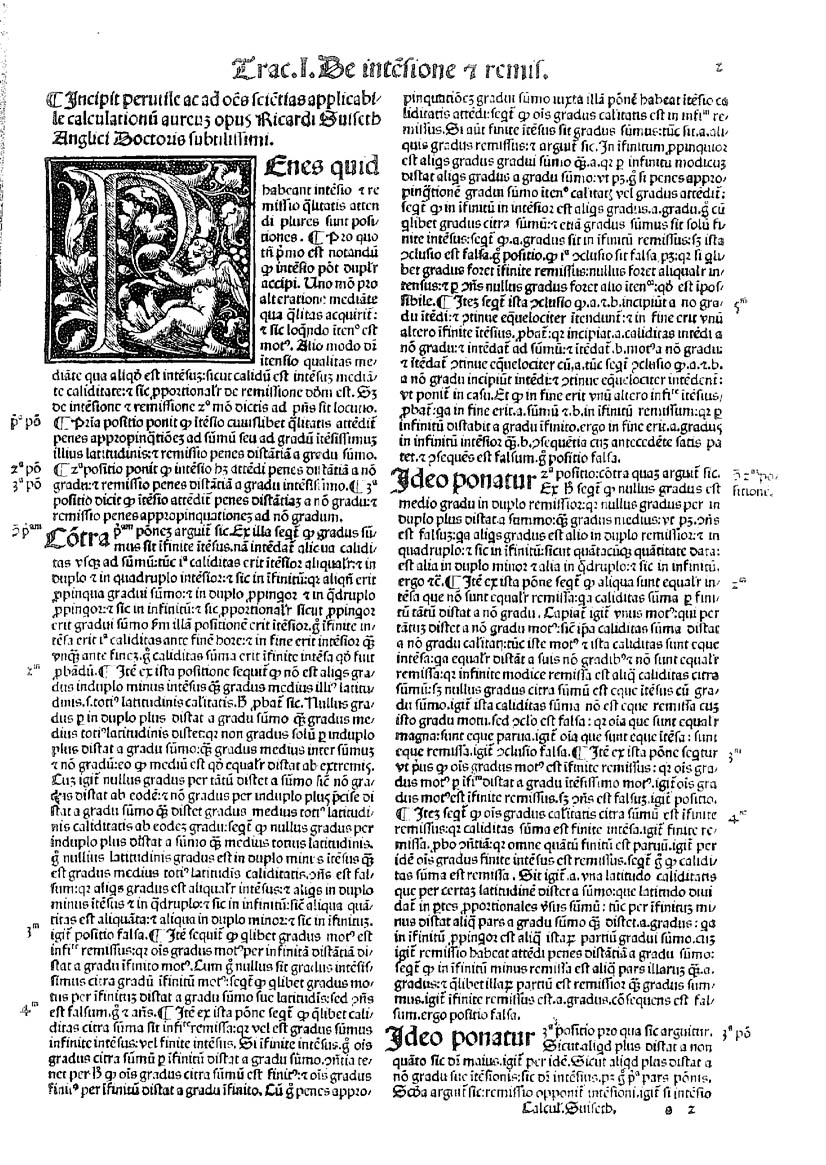
Calculator, 1520

Robert Burton (d. 1640) wrote in The Anatomy of Melancholy that "Scaliger and Cardan admire Suisset the calculator, qui pene modum excessit humani ingenii [whose talents were almost superhuman]".

Gottfried Leibniz wrote in a letter of 1714: "Il y a eu autrefois un Suisse, qui avoit mathématisé dans la Scholastique: ses Ouvrages sont peu connus; mais ce que j'en ai vu m'a paru profond et considérable." ("There was once a Suisse, who did mathematics belonging to scholasticism; his works are little known, but what I have seen of them seemed to me profound and relevant.") Leibniz had a copy of one of Swineshead's treatises made from an edition in the Bibliothèque du Roi in Paris and credited Swineshead as "the man 'who introduced mathematics into scholastic philosophy.'"
