= Nordstrom (disambiguation) =

Nordstrom is a chain of US department stores.

Nordstrom, Nordstrøm, or Nordström are surnames of Scandinavian origin.

== Nordstrom ==
- Dagmar Nordstrom (1903–1976), American composer, pianist, arranger, accompanist and harmony of the Nordstrom Sisters
- Frances Nordstrom, American actress and playwright.
- Marie Nordstrom, American actress.
- John W. Nordstrom (1871–1963), Swedish-born co-founder of the Nordstrom department store chain
- Siggie Nordstrom (1893–1980), American entertainer, lead singer of the Nordstrom Sisters
- Swede Nordstrom (1896–1963), American football player
- The Nordstrom Sisters (1931–1976), American sister act, international cabaret singers
- Ursula Nordstrom (1910–1988), publisher and editor in chief of juvenile books at Harper & Row from 1940 to 1973.

== Nordström ==
- Alison Nordström (born 1950), writer on photography
- Anders Nordström, Swedish physician, Acting Director-General of the World Health Organization (WHO)
- Charlotte Nordström (born 1963), Swedish politician
- Clara Nordström, German writer and translator of Swedish descent
- Ester Blenda Nordström (1891–1948), Swedish journalist, author and explorer
- Fredrik Nordström Swedish record producer and guitar player
- Gunnar Nordström (1881–1923), Finnish theoretical physicist
- Henrik Nordström (1891–1982), Swedish track and field athlete who competed in the 1912 Summer Olympics
- Jockum Nordström, Swedish artist
- Karl Nordström (1855–1923), Swedish painter
- Kjell Nordström (politician) (born 1949), Swedish politician
- Kjell A. Nordström, Swedish economist, writer and public speaker
- Lars-Gunnar Nordström (1924–2014), Finnish non-representational artist
- Peter Nordström, Swedish professional ice hockey player
- Sivar Nordström, Swedish orienteering competitor
- Susanne Nordström (born 1963), Swedish politician
- Tina Nordström, Swedish chef, television personality, and pitch lady

== Nordstrøm ==
- Rikard Nordstrøm (1893–1955), Danish gymnast who competed in the 1912 Summer Olympics

== Other ==
- Nordstrøm (band), Danish band
- Nordström's theory of gravitation, two distinct theories proposed by the Finnish theoretical physicist Gunnar Nordström
- Reissner–Nordström metric, in physics and astronomy, a static solution to the Einstein field equations in empty space
- Náströnd - Norse realm of hel.

== See also ==
- Norström
