= History of gravitational theory =

Pioneers of gravitational theory

Aristotle

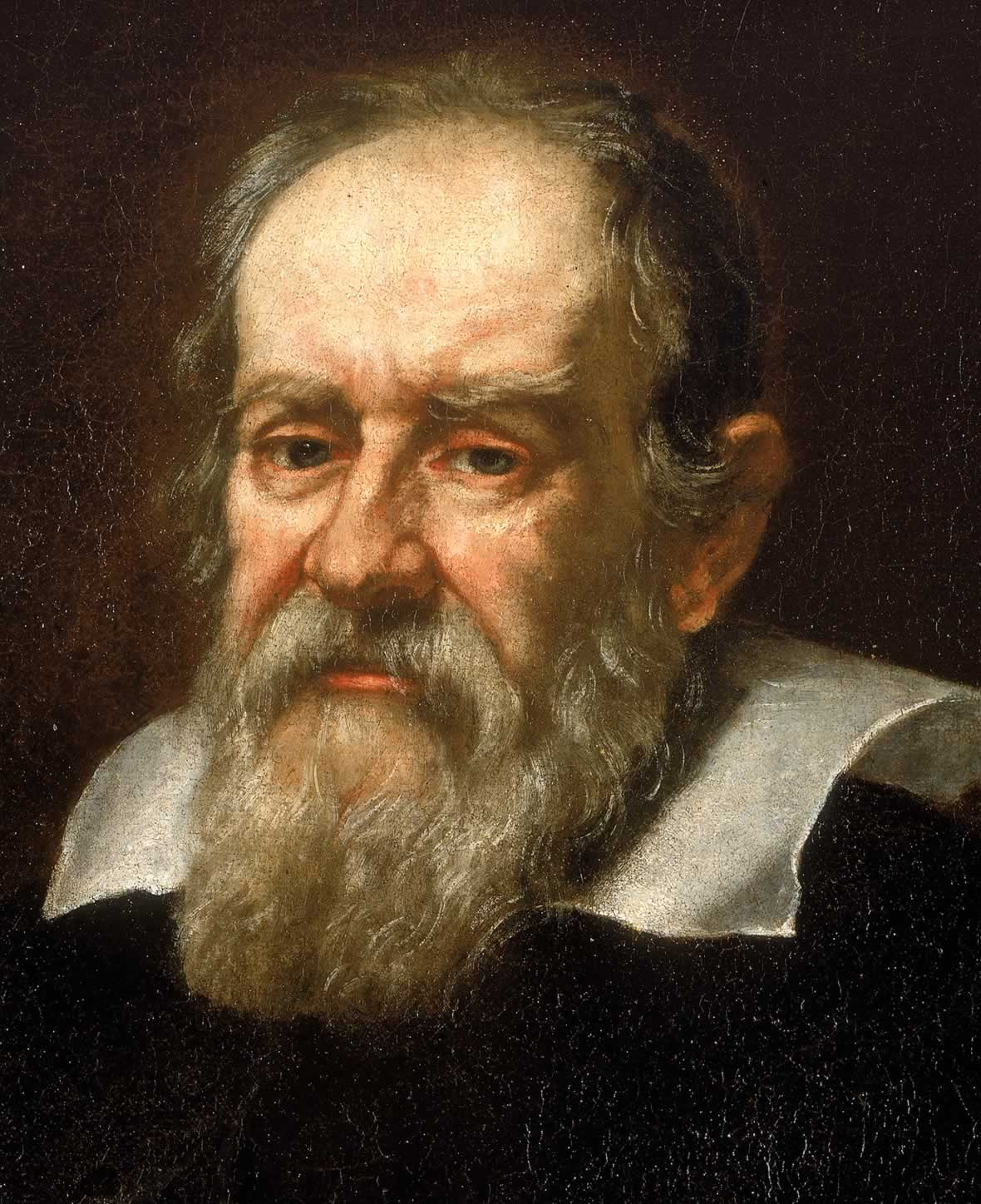
Galileo Galilei

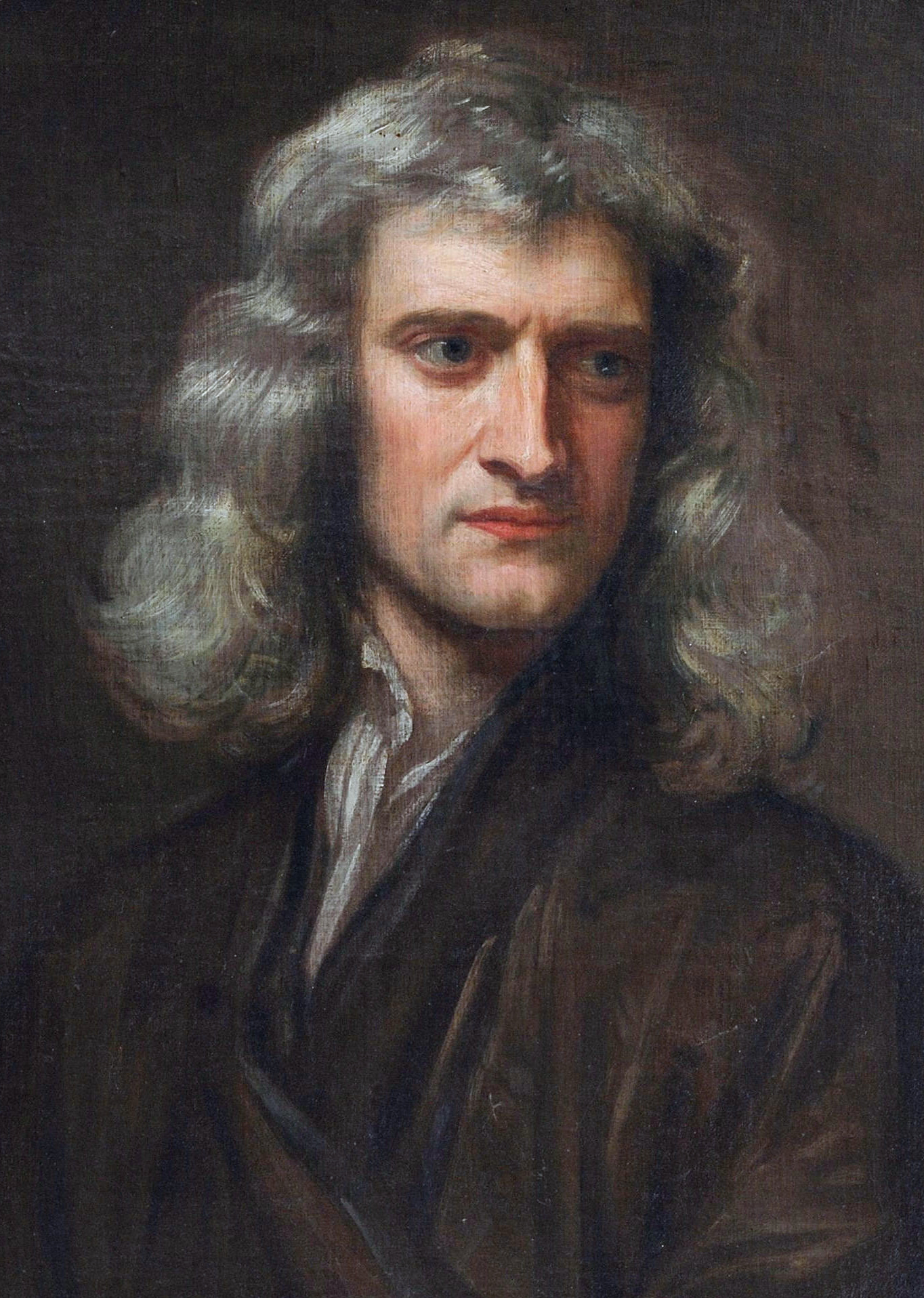
Isaac Newton

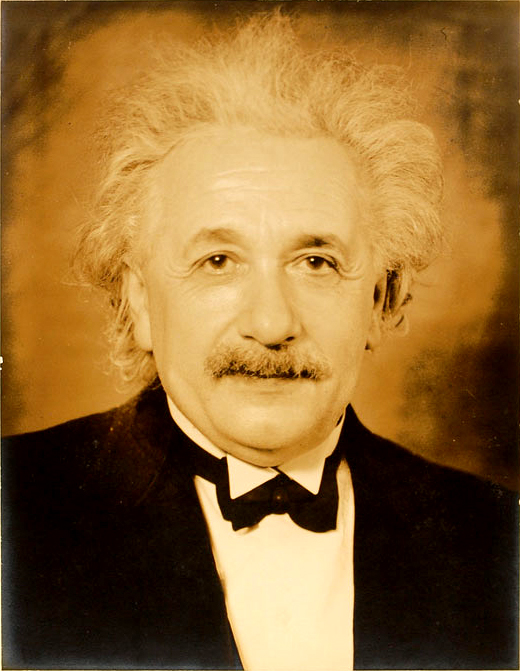
Albert Einstein

In physics, theories of gravitation postulate mechanisms of interaction governing the movements of bodies with mass. There have been numerous theories of gravitation since ancient times. The first extant sources discussing such theories are found in ancient Greek philosophy. This work was furthered through the Middle Ages by Indian, Islamic, and European scientists, before gaining great strides during the Renaissance and Scientific Revolution—culminating in the formulation of Newton's law of gravity. This was superseded by Albert Einstein's theory of relativity in the early 20th century.

Greek philosopher Aristotle (fl. 4th century BC) found that objects immersed in a medium tend to fall at speeds proportional to their weight. Vitruvius (fl. 1st century BC) understood that objects fall based on their specific gravity. In the 6th century AD, Byzantine Alexandrian scholar John Philoponus modified the Aristotelian concept of gravity with the theory of impetus. In the 7th century, Indian astronomer Brahmagupta spoke of gravity as an attractive force. In the 14th century, European philosophers Jean Buridan and Albert of Saxony—who were influenced by Islamic scholars Ibn Sina and Abu'l-Barakat respectively—developed the theory of impetus and linked it to the acceleration and mass of objects. Albert also developed a law of proportion regarding the relationship between the speed of an object in free fall and the time elapsed.

Italians of the 16th century found that objects in free fall tend to accelerate equally. In 1632, Galileo Galilei put forth the basic principle of relativity. The existence of the gravitational constant was explored by various researchers from the mid-17th century, helping Isaac Newton formulate his law of universal gravitation. Newton's classical mechanics were superseded in the early 20th century, when Einstein developed the special and general theories of relativity. An elemental force carrier of gravity is hypothesized in quantum gravity approaches such as string theory, in a potentially unified theory of everything.

== Antiquity ==
=== Classical antiquity ===
==== Heraclitus, Anaxagoras, Empedocles and Leucippus ====
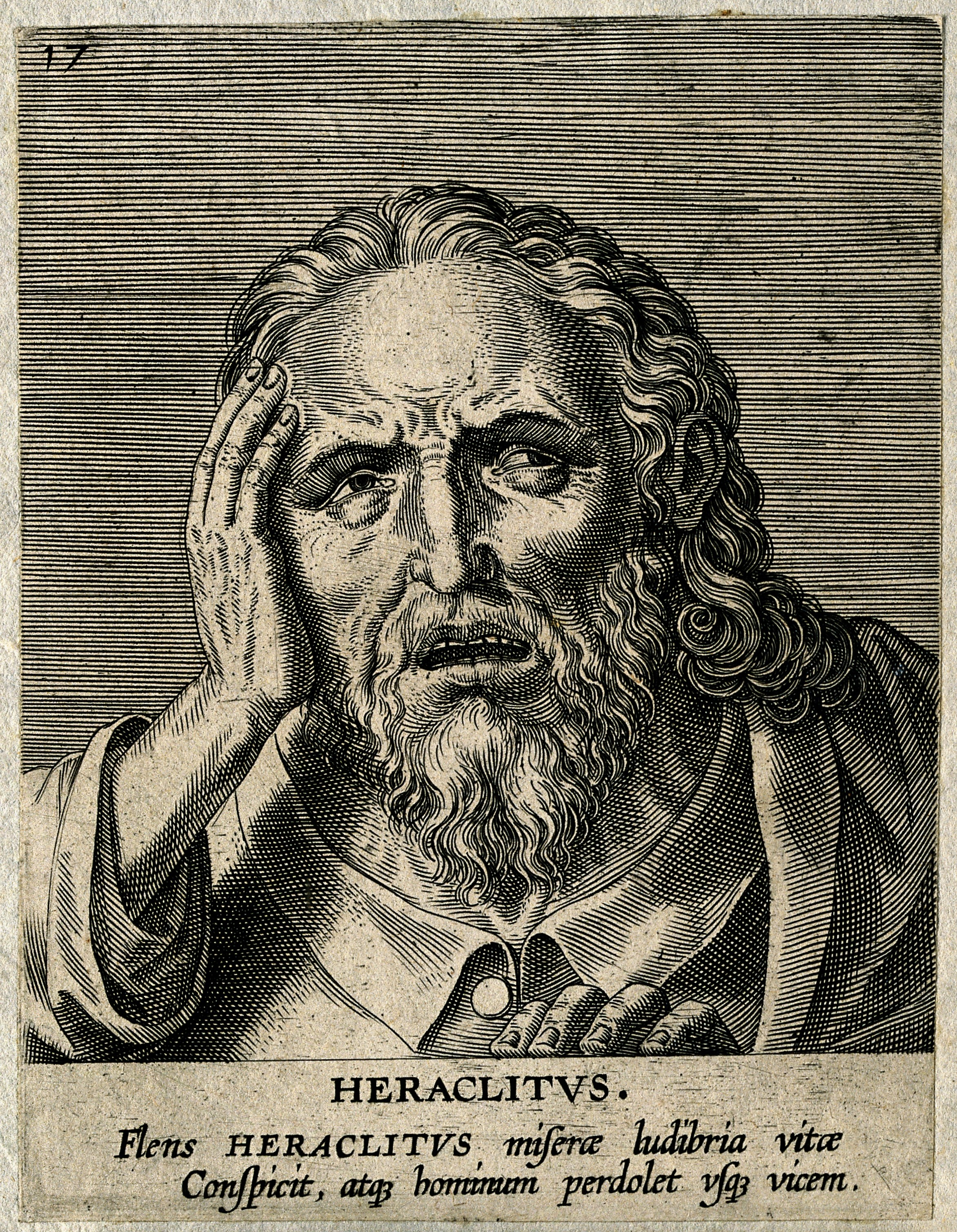
Heraclitus

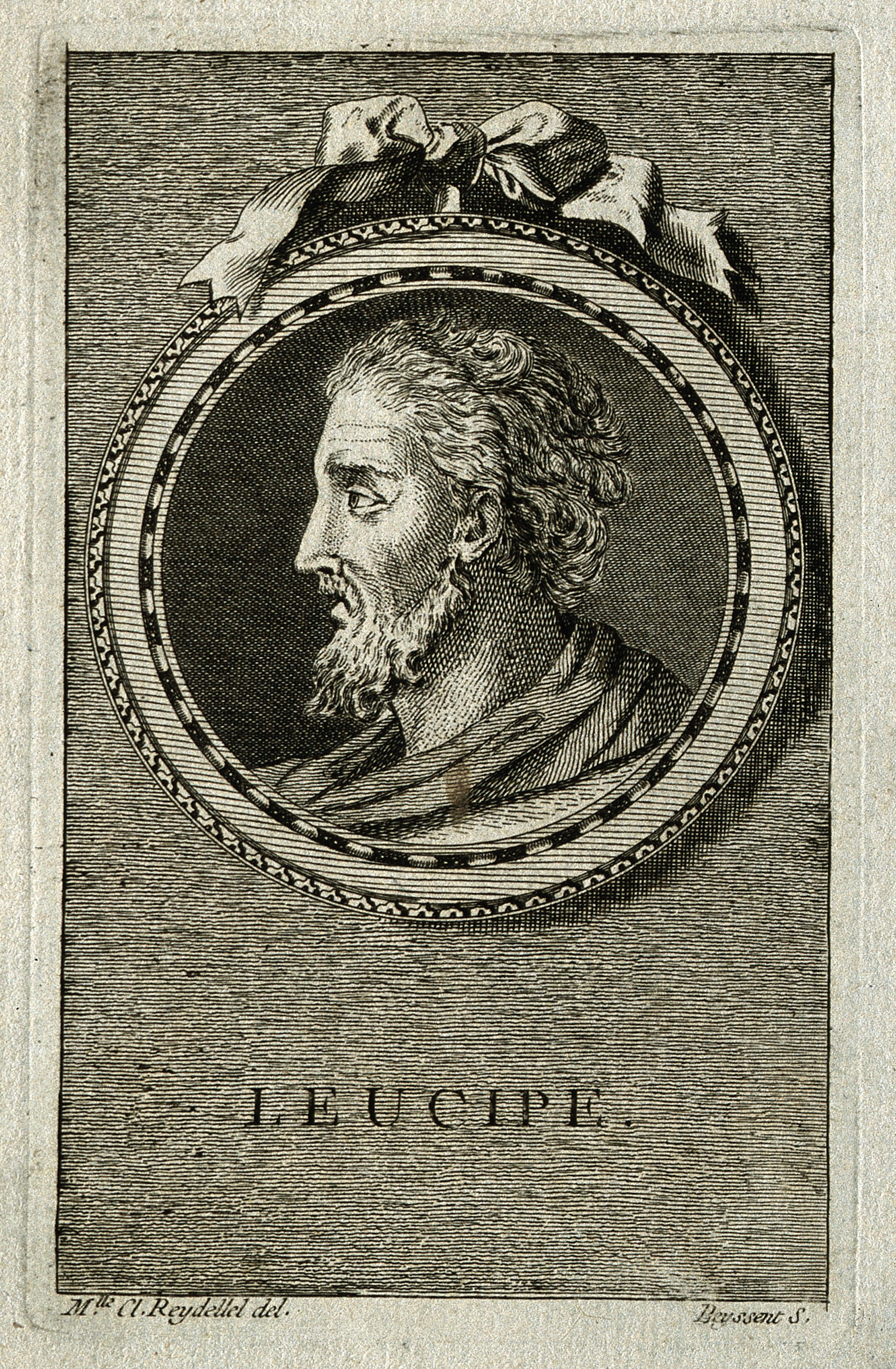
Leucippus

The pre-Socratic Greek philosopher Heraclitus (c. 535 – c. 475 BC) of the Ionian School used the word logos ('word') to describe a kind of law which keeps the cosmos in harmony, moving all objects, including the stars, winds, and waves. Anaxagoras (c. 500 – c. 428 BC), another Ionian philosopher, introduced the concept of nous ('cosmic mind') as an ordering force.

In the cosmogony of the Greek philosopher Empedocles (c. 494 – c. 434/443 BC), there were two opposing fundamental cosmic forces of "attraction" and "repulsion", which Empedocles personified as "Love" and "Strife" (Philotes and Neikos).

The ancient atomist Leucippus (5th century BC) proposed the cosmos was created when a large group of atoms came together and swirled as a vortex. The smaller atoms became the celestial bodies of the cosmos. The larger atoms in the center came together as a membrane from which the Earth was formed.

==== Aristotle ====
Aristotle found that objects immersed in a medium tend to fall at speeds proportional to their weight and inversely proportional to the density of the medium.

In the 4th century BC, Greek philosopher Aristotle taught that there is no effect or motion without a cause. The cause of the downward natural motion of heavy bodies, such as the classical elements of earth and water, was related to their nature (gravity), which caused them to move downward toward the center of the (geocentric) universe. For this reason Aristotle supported a spherical Earth, since "every portion of earth has weight until it reaches the centre, and the jostling of parts greater and smaller would bring about not a waved surface, but rather compression and convergence of part and part until the centre is reached". On the other hand, light bodies such as the element fire and air, were moved by their nature (levity) upward toward the celestial sphere of the Moon (see sublunary sphere). Astronomical objects near the fixed stars are composed of aether, whose natural motion is circular. Beyond them is the prime mover, the final cause of all motion in the cosmos. In his Physics, Aristotle correctly asserted that objects immersed in a medium tend to fall at speeds proportional to their weight and inversely proportional to the density of the medium.

==== Strato of Lampsacus, Epicurus and Aristarchus of Samos ====
Greek philosopher Strato of Lampsacus (c. 335 – c. 269 BC) rejected the Aristotelian belief of "natural places" in exchange for a mechanical view in which objects do not gain weight as they fall, instead arguing that the greater impact was due to an increase in speed.

Epicurus (c. 341 – 270 BC) viewed weight as an inherent property of atoms which influences their movement. These atoms move downward in constant free fall within an infinite vacuum without friction at equal speed, regardless of their mass. On the other hand, upward motion is due to atomic collisions. Epicureans deviated from older atomist theories like that of Democritus (c. 460 – c. 370 BC) by proposing the idea that atoms may randomly deviate from their expected course.

Greek astronomer Aristarchus of Samos (c. 310 – c. 230 BC) theorized Earth's rotation around its own axis, as well as Earth's orbit around the Sun in a heliocentric cosmology. Seleucus of Seleucia (c. 190 – c. 150 BC) supported his cosmology and also described gravitational effects of the Moon on the tidal range.

==== Archimedes ====
The 3rd-century BC Greek physicist Archimedes (c. 287 – c. 212 BC) discovered the centre of mass of a triangle. He also postulated that if the centres of gravity of two equal weights was not the same, it would be located in the middle of the line that joins them, a result he used to prove the law of the lever and to extend his equilibrium analysis to floating bodies. In On Floating Bodies, Archimedes claimed that for any object submerged in a fluid there is an equivalent upward buoyant force to the weight of the fluid displaced by the object's volume. The fluids described by Archimedes are not self-gravitating, since he assumes that "any fluid at rest is the surface of a sphere whose centre is the same as that of the Earth".

==== Hipparchus of Nicaea, Lucretius and Vitruvius ====
Greek astronomer Hipparchus of Nicaea (c. 190 – c. 120 BC) also rejected Aristotelian physics and followed Strato in adopting some form of theory of impetus to explain motion. The poem De rerum natura by Lucretius (c. 99 – c. 55 BC) asserts that more massive bodies fall faster in a medium because the latter resists less, but in a vacuum fall with equal speed. Roman engineer and architect Vitruvius (c. 85 – c. 15 BC) contends in his De architectura that gravity is not dependent on a substance's weight but rather on its 'nature' (cf. specific gravity):

If the quicksilver is poured into a vessel, and a stone weighing one hundred pounds is laid upon it, the stone swims on the surface, and cannot depress the liquid, nor break through, nor separate it. If we remove the hundred pound weight, and put on a scruple of gold, it will not swim, but will sink to the bottom of its own accord. Hence, it is undeniable that the gravity of a substance depends not on the amount of its weight, but on its nature. (translated from the original Latin by W. Newton)

==== Plutarch, Pliny the Elder, and Claudius Ptolemy ====
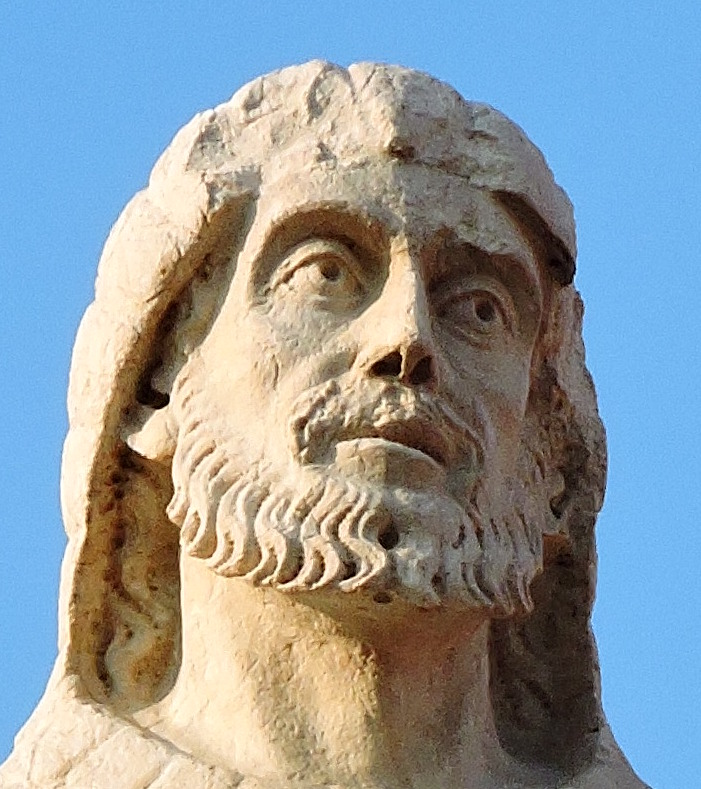
Pliny the Elder

Greek philosopher Plutarch (c. 46 – c. 120 AD) attested the existence of Roman astronomers who rejected Aristotelian physics, "even contemplating theories of inertia and universal gravitation". In his work De facie in orbe lunae, he suggested that gravitational attraction was not unique to the Earth, but applied to other bodies such as the Sun and the Moon, which were held to attract the parts of which they are made. His conception of gravity as a tendency of parts to unite with their whole coincides with Nicolaus Copernicus’s account of gravity. He also proposed a thought experiment in which a heavy object falling through a tunnel in the Earth might either stop at the center or overshoot and oscillate, anticipating the medieval theory of impetus.

The gravitational effects of the Moon on the tides were noticed by Pliny the Elder (23–79 AD) in his Naturalis Historia and Claudius Ptolemy (c. 100 – c. 170 AD) in his Tetrabiblos.

=== Byzantine era ===
==== John Philoponus ====
In the 6th century AD, the Byzantine Alexandrian scholar John Philoponus proposed the theory of impetus, which modifies Aristotle's theory that "continuation of motion depends on continued action of a force" by incorporating a causative force which diminishes over time. In his commentary on Aristotle's Physics that "if one lets fall simultaneously from the same height two bodies differing greatly in weight, one will find that the ratio of the times of their motion does not correspond to the ratios of their weights, but the difference in time is a very small one".

== Indian subcontinent ==
=== Brahmagupta ===
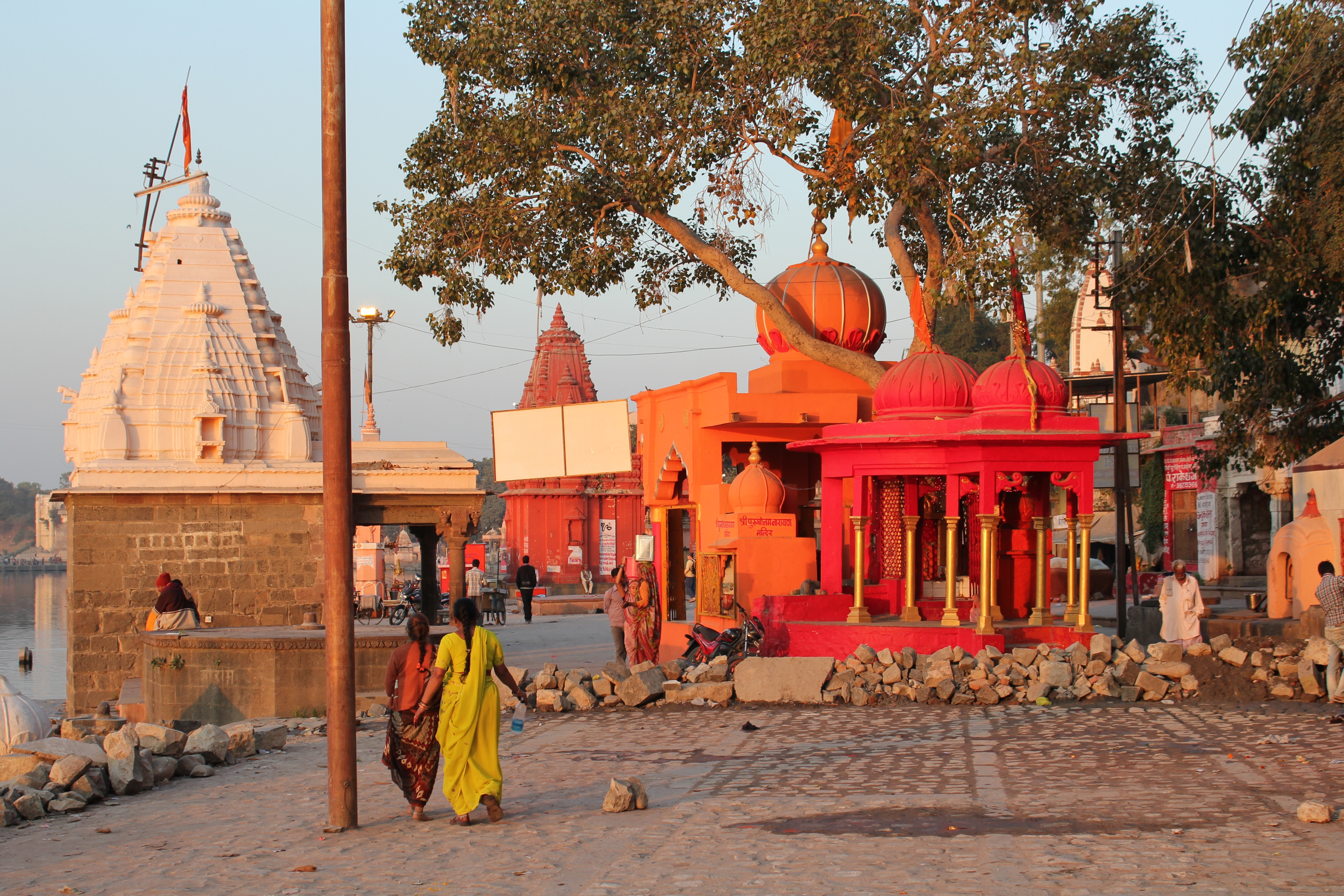
Ujjain, Ram Ghat, home to Brahmagupta and Bhaskaracharya

Brahmagupta (c. 598 – c. 668 AD) was the first Indian scholar to describe gravity as an attractive force:

The earth on all its sides is the same; all people on the earth stand upright, and all heavy things fall down to the earth by a law of nature, for it is the nature of the earth to attract and to keep things, as it is the nature of water to flow ... If a thing wants to go deeper down than the earth, let it try. The earth is the only low thing, and seeds always return to it, in whatever direction you may throw them away, and never rise upwards from the earth. (Note: The source of this quote is Al-Biruni's India (c. 1030).)

=== Bhāskara II ===
Bhāskara II (c. 1114 – c. 1185), another Indian mathematician and astronomer, describes gravity as an inherent attractive property of Earth in the section "Golādhyāyah" ("On Spherics") of his treatise Siddhānta Shiromani:

The property of attraction is inherent in the Earth. By this property the Earth attracts any unsupported heavy thing towards it: The thing appears to be falling but it is in a state of being drawn to Earth. ... It is manifest from this that ... people situated at distances of a fourth part of the circumference [of earth] from us or in the opposite hemisphere, cannot by any means fall downwards [in space].

== Islamic world ==
=== Abu Ma'shar ===
Ancient Greeks like Posidonius had associated the tides in the sea with to be influenced by moonlight. Around 850, Abu Ma'shar al-Balkhi recorded the tides and the moon position and noticed high-tides when the Moon was below the horizon. Abu Ma'shar considered an alternative explanation where the Moon and the sea had to share some astrological virtue that attracted each other. This work was translated into Latin and became one of the two main theories for tides for European scholars.

=== Ibn Sina ===
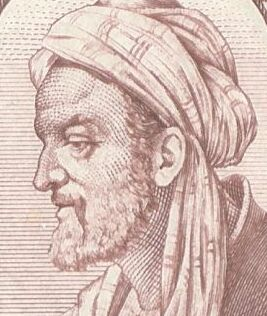
Ibn Sina

In the 11th century, Persian polymath Ibn Sina (Avicenna) agreed with Philoponus' theory that "the moved object acquires an inclination from the mover" as an explanation for projectile motion. Ibn Sina then published his own theory of impetus in The Book of Healing (c. 1020). Unlike Philoponus, who believed that it was a temporary virtue that would decline even in a vacuum, Ibn Sina viewed it as a persistent, requiring external forces such as air resistance to dissipate it. Ibn Sina made distinction between force and inclination (mayl), and argued that an object gained inclination when the object is in opposition to its natural motion. He concluded that continuation of motion is attributed to the inclination that is transferred to the object, and that object will be in motion until the inclination is spent. The Iraqi polymath Ibn al-Haytham describes gravity as a force in which heavier body moves towards the centre of the earth. He also describes the force of gravity will only move towards the direction of the centre of the earth not in different directions.

=== Al-Biruni ===
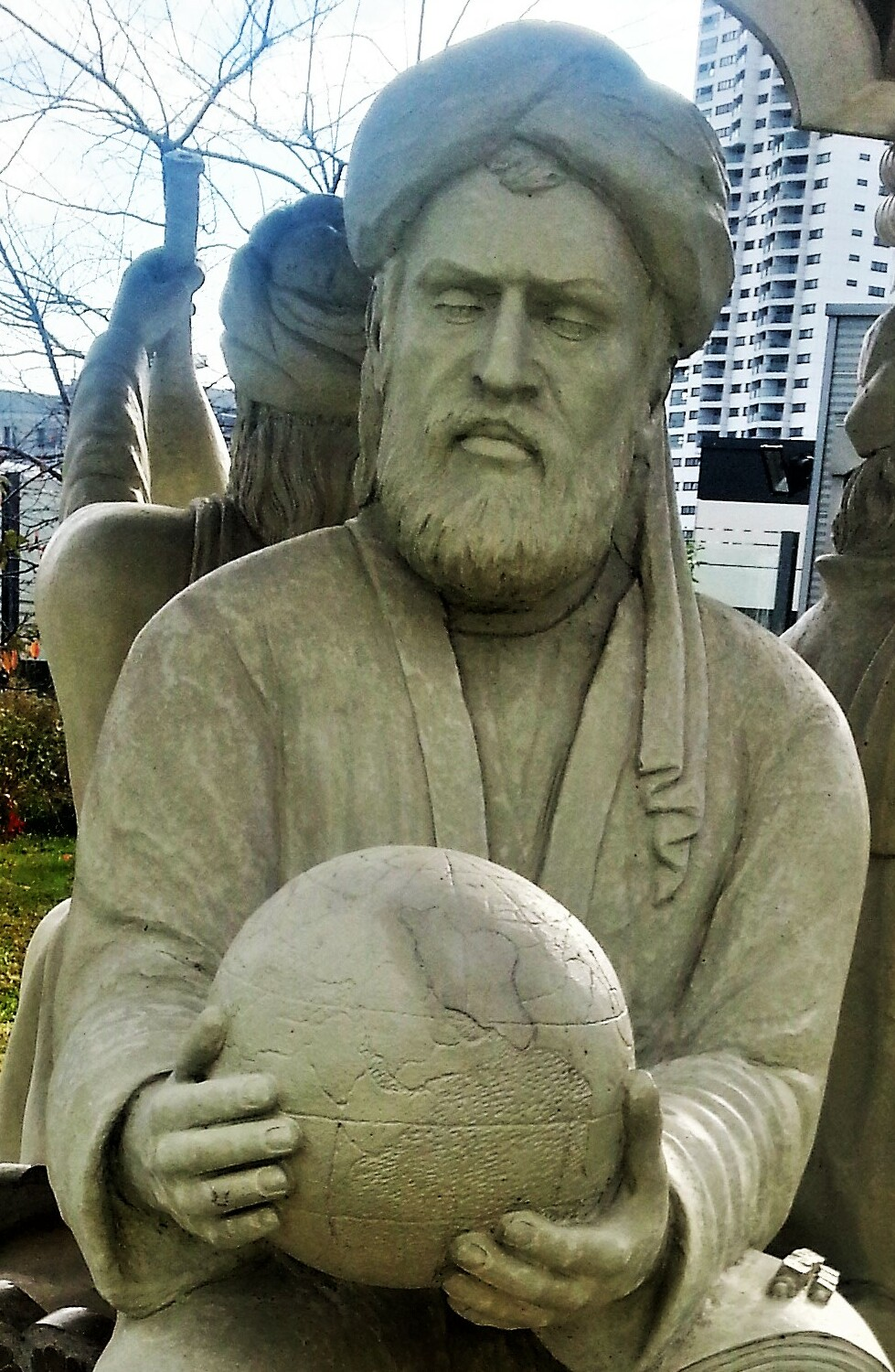
Al-Biruni

Another 11th-century Persian polymath, Al-Biruni, proposed that heavenly bodies have mass, weight, and gravity, just like the Earth. He criticized both Aristotle and Ibn Sina for holding the view that only the Earth has these properties. The 12th-century scholar Al-Khazini suggested that the gravity an object contains varies depending on its distance from the centre of the universe (referring to the centre of the Earth). Al-Biruni and Al-Khazini studied the theory of the centre of gravity, and generalized and applied it to three-dimensional bodies. Fine experimental methods were also developed for determining the specific gravity or specific weight of objects, based the theory of balances and weighing.

=== Abu'l-Barakāt al-Baghdādī ===
In the 12th century, Ibn Malka al-Baghdadi adopted and modified Ibn Sina's theory on projectile motion. In his Kitab al-Mu'tabar, Abu'l-Barakat stated that the mover imparts a violent inclination (mayl qasri) on the moved and that this diminishes as the moving object distances itself from the mover. According to Shlomo Pines, al-Baghdādī's theory of motion was "the oldest negation of Aristotle's fundamental dynamic law [namely, that a constant force produces a uniform motion], [and is thus an] anticipation in a vague fashion of the fundamental law of classical mechanics [namely, that a force applied continuously produces acceleration]."

== European Renaissance ==
=== 14th century ===
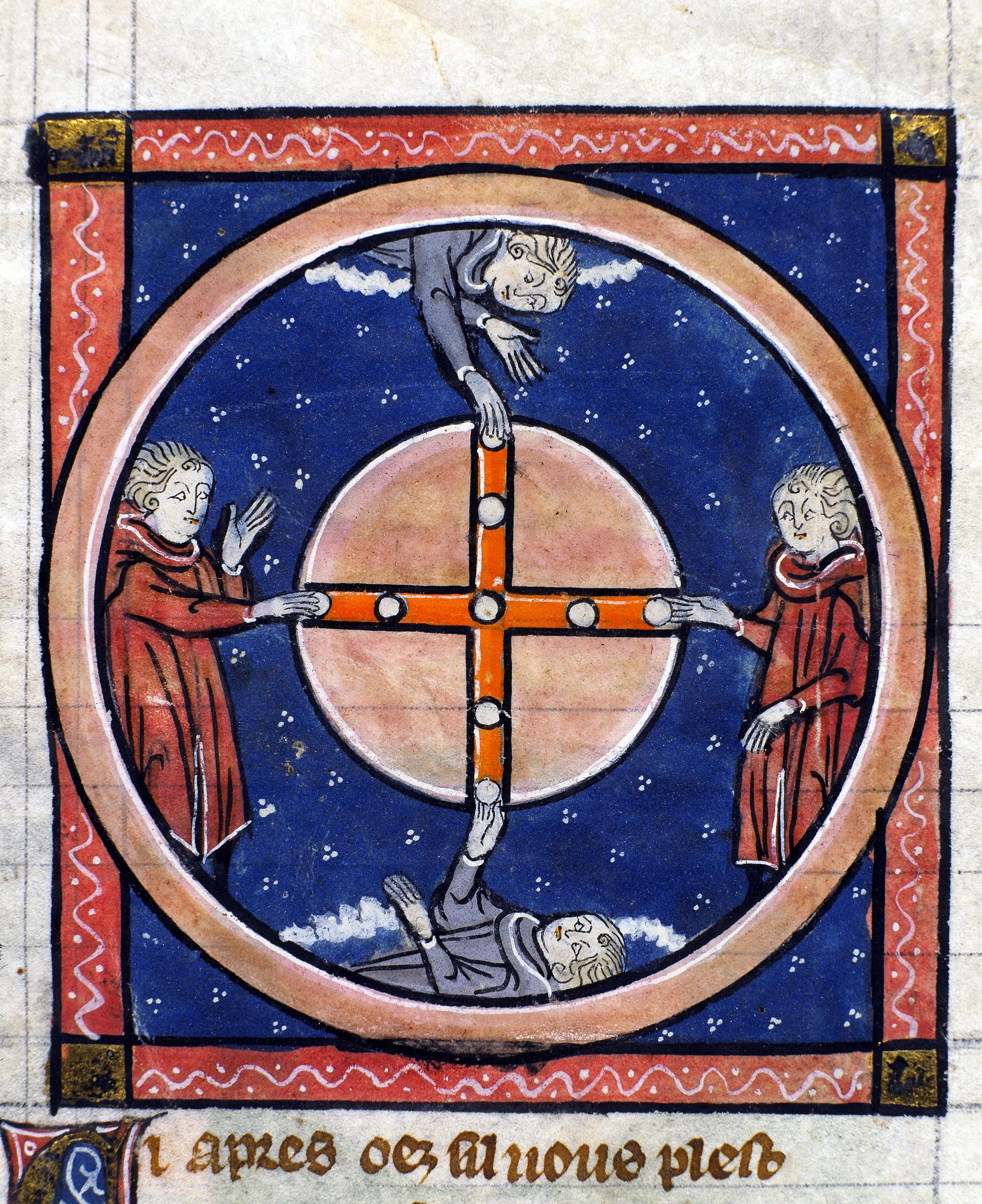
A 14th century illustration from Gautier de Metz's L'Image du monde showing the gravitational attraction of the Earth at its antipodes.

==== Jean Buridan, the Oxford Calculators, Albert of Saxony ====
In the 14th century, both the French philosopher Jean Buridan and the Oxford Calculators (the Merton School) of the Merton College of Oxford rejected the Aristotelian concept of gravity. (Note: This was interpreted as deriving the weight of objects from the pressure of the air below them.) They attributed the motion of objects to an impetus (akin to momentum), which varies according to velocity and mass; Buridan was influenced in this by Ibn Sina's Book of Healing. Buridan and the philosopher Albert of Saxony (c. 1320 – c. 1390) adopted Abu'l-Barakat's theory that the acceleration of a falling body is a result of its increasing impetus. Influenced by Buridan, Albert developed a law of proportion regarding the relationship between the speed of an object in free fall and the time elapsed. He also theorized that mountains and valleys are caused by erosion (Note: Leonardo da Vinci tested this theory by observing trace fossils, which he used to argue against the myth of a universal flood.)—displacing the Earth's centre of gravity. (Note: Furthermore, he hypothesized that the planet is in equilibrium when its centre of gravity coincides with that of its mass.)

==== Uniform and difform motion ====
The roots of Domingo de Soto's expression uniform difform motion [uniformly accelerated motion] lies in the Oxford Calculators terms "uniform" and "difform" motion: "uniform motion" was used differently then than it would be by later writers, and might have referred both to constant speed and to motion in which all parts of a body are moving at equal speed. The Calculators did not illustrate the different types of motion with real-world examples. John of Holland at the University of Prague, illustrated uniform motion with what would later be called uniform velocity, but also with a falling stone (all parts moving at the same speed), and with a sphere in uniform rotation. He did, however, make distinctions between different kinds of "uniform" motion. Difform motion was exemplified by walking at increasing speed.

==== Mean speed theorem ====
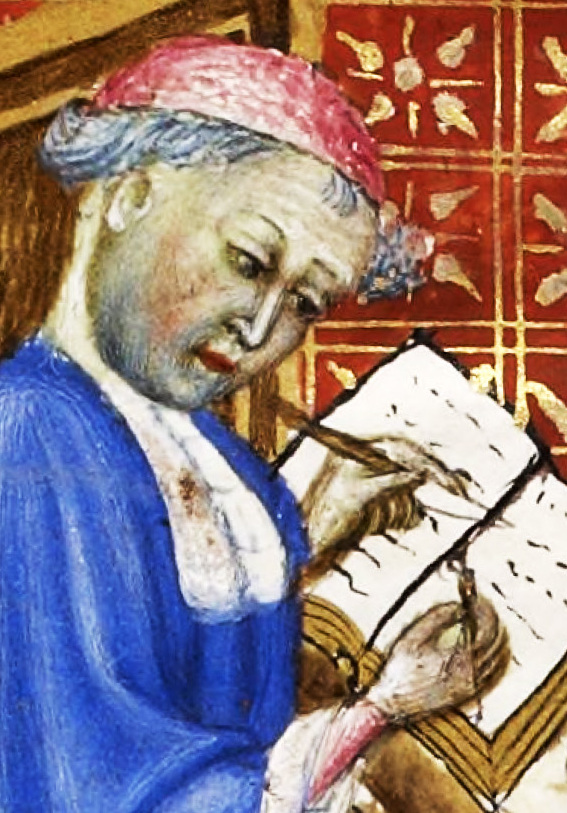
Nicole Oresme

Also in the 14th century, the Merton School developed the mean speed theorem; a uniformly accelerated body starting from rest travels the same distance as a body with uniform speed whose speed is half the final velocity of the accelerated body. The mean speed theorem was proved by Nicole Oresme (c. 1323 – 1382) and would be influential in later gravitational equations. Written as a modern equation:

$\ s=\frac{1}{2}v_ft$

However, since small time intervals could not be measured, the relationship between time and distance was not so evident as the equation suggests. More generally; equations, which were not widely used until after Galileo's time, imply a clarity that was not there.

=== 15th–16th centuries ===
==== Leonardo da Vinci ====
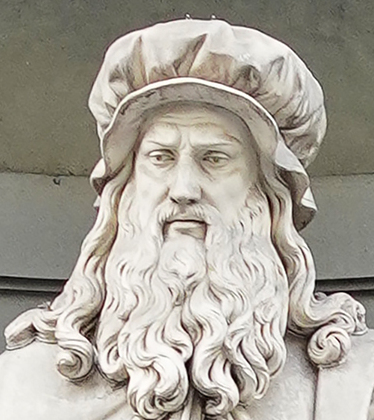
Leonardo da Vinci

Leonardo da Vinci (1452–1519) made drawings recording the acceleration of falling objects. He wrote that the "mother and origin of gravity" is energy. He describes two pairs of physical powers which stem from a metaphysical origin and have an effect on everything: abundance of force and motion, and gravity and resistance. He associates gravity with the 'cold' classical elements, water and earth, and calls its energy infinite. (Note: Leonardo did not publish his manuscripts and they had no direct influence on subsequent science.) In Codex Arundel, Leonardo recorded that if a water-pouring vase moves transversally (sideways), simulating the trajectory of a vertically falling object, it produces a right triangle with equal leg length, composed of falling material that forms the hypotenuse and the vase trajectory forming one of the legs. On the hypotenuse, Leonardo noted the equivalence of the two orthogonal motions, one effected by gravity and the other proposed by the experimenter.

==== Nicolaus Copernicus, Petrus Apianus ====
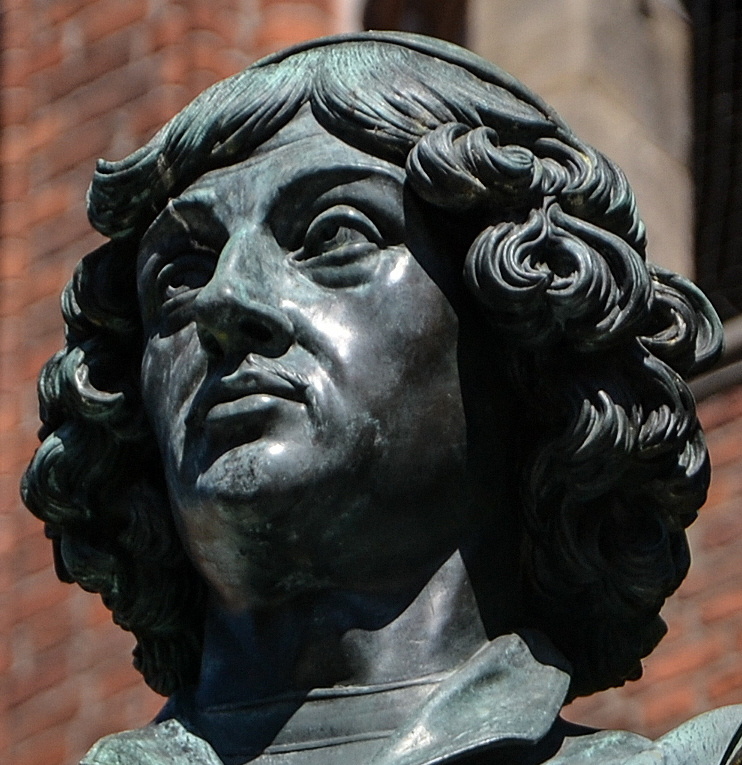
Nicolaus Copernicus

By 1514, Nicolaus Copernicus had written an outline of his heliocentric model, in which he stated that Earth's centre is the centre of both its rotation and the orbit of the Moon. (Note: He accounted for these movements by explaining, "Rotation is natural to a sphere, and by that very act is its shape expressed.") In 1533, German humanist Petrus Apianus described the exertion of gravity: (Note: Physicist Pierre Duhem erroneously attributes this to Jordanus Nemorarius, whom he calls the "precursor of Leonardo". Leonardo alludes to Jordanus in his notebooks, but not to any of his theories.)

Since it is apparent that in the descent [along the arc] there is more impediment acquired, it is clear that gravity is diminished on this account. But because this comes about by reason of the position of heavy bodies, let it be called a positional gravity [i.e. gravitas secundum situm]

==== Francesco Beato and Luca Ghini ====
By 1544, according to Benedetto Varchi, the experiments of at least two Italians, Francesco Beato, a Dominican philosopher at Pisa, and Luca Ghini, a physician and botanist from Bologna, had dispelled the Aristotelian claim that objects fall at speeds proportional to their weight.

==== Domingo de Soto ====
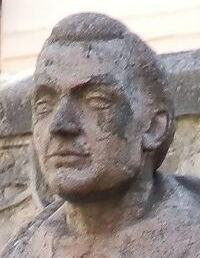
Domingo de Soto

In 1551, Domingo de Soto theorized that objects in free fall accelerate uniformly in his book Physicorum Aristotelis quaestiones. This idea was subsequently explored in more detail by Galileo Galilei, who derived his kinematics from the 14th-century Merton College and Jean Buridan, and possibly De Soto as well.

== Scientific Revolution ==
=== Simon Stevin ===
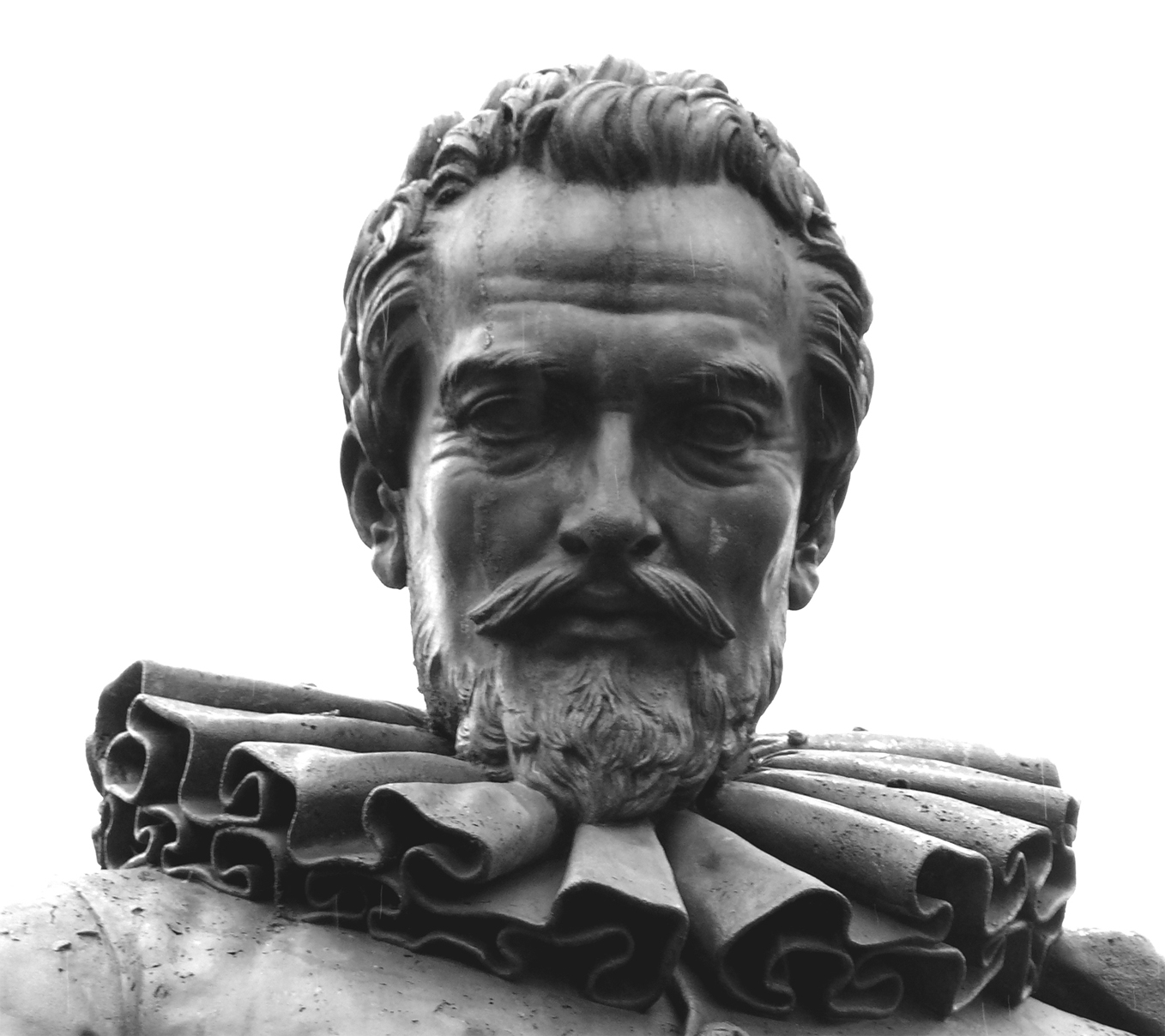
Simon Stevin

In 1585, Flemish polymath Simon Stevin performed a demonstration for Jan Cornets de Groot, a local politician in the Dutch city of Delft. Stevin dropped two lead balls from the Nieuwe Kerk in that city. From the sound of the impacts, Stevin deduced that the balls had fallen at the same speed. The result was published in 1586.

Let us take (as ... Jan Cornets de Groot ... and I have done) two balls of lead, the one ten times larger and heavier than the other, and drop them together from a height of 30 feet on to a board or something on which they give a perceptible sound. Then it will be found that the lighter will not be ten times longer on its way than the heavier, but that they fall together on to the board so simultaneously that their two sounds seem to be one and the same. ... Therefore Aristotle ... is wrong.

— Simon Stevin, De Beghinselen der Weeghconst

=== Galileo Galilei ===
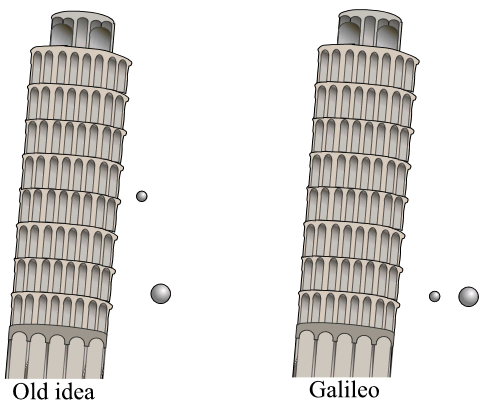
Comparison of the antiquated view and the outcome of the experiment (size of the spheres represent their masses, not their volumes)

Between 1589 and 1592, the Italian scientist Galileo Galilei (then professor of mathematics at the University of Pisa) is said to have dropped "unequal weights of the same material" from the Leaning Tower of Pisa to demonstrate that their time of descent was independent of their mass, according to a biography by Galileo's pupil Vincenzo Viviani, composed in 1654 and published in 1717. The basic premise had already been demonstrated by Italian experimenters a few decades earlier.

According to the story, Galileo discovered through this experiment that the objects fell with the same acceleration, proving his prediction true, while at the same time disproving Aristotle's theory of gravity (which states that objects fall at speed proportional to their mass). Though Viviani wrote that Galileo conducted "repeated experiments made from the height of the Leaning Tower of Pisa in the presence of other professors and all the students," most historians consider it to have been a thought experiment rather than a physical test.

Galileo successfully applied mathematics to the acceleration of falling objects, correctly hypothesizing in a 1604 letter to Paolo Sarpi that the distance of a falling object is proportional to the square of the time elapsed. (Note: The distance traversed in successive equal intervals of time is calculated with a triangular model whose width (representing maximum velocity) increases by two for every equal section of height (representing time elapsed). This is in part anticipated by the Merton rule.)

I have arrived at a proposition, ... namely, that spaces traversed in natural motion are in the squared proportion of the times.

— Galileo Galilei, Letter to Paolo Sarpi

Written with modern symbols: s ∝ t^{2}

The result was published in Two New Sciences in 1638. In the same book, Galileo suggested that the slight variance of speed of falling objects of different mass was due to air resistance, and that objects would fall completely uniformly in a vacuum. The relation of the distance of objects in free fall to the square of the time taken was confirmed by Italian Jesuits Grimaldi and Riccioli between 1640 and 1650. They also made a calculation of the gravity of Earth by recording the oscillations of a pendulum.

=== Johannes Kepler ===
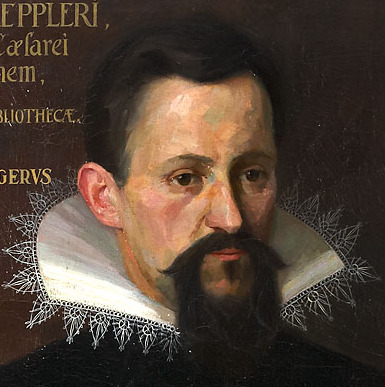
Johannes Kepler

In his Astronomia nova (1609), Johannes Kepler proposed an attractive force of limited radius between any "kindred" bodies:

Gravity is a mutual corporeal disposition among kindred bodies to unite or join together; thus the earth attracts a stone much more than the stone seeks the earth. (The magnetic faculty is another example of this sort).... If two stones were set near one another in some place in the world outside the sphere of influence of a third kindred body, these stones, like two magnetic bodies, would come together in an intermediate place, each approaching the other by a space proportional to the bulk [moles] of the other....

Kepler claimed that if the Earth and Moon were not held apart by some force they would come together. He recognized that mechanical forces cause action, resulting in a more modern view of planetary motion, in his view a celestial machine. On the other hand Kepler viewed the force of the Sun on the planets as magnetic and acting tangential to their orbits and he assumed with Aristotle that inertia meant objects tend to come to rest.

=== Giovanni Borelli ===
In 1666, Giovanni Alfonso Borelli avoided the key problems that limited Kepler. By Borelli's time the concept of inertia had its modern meaning as the tendency of objects to remain in uniform motion and he viewed the Sun as just another heavenly body. Borelli developed the idea of mechanical equilibrium, a balance between inertia and gravity. Newton cited Borelli's influence on his theory.

=== Evangelista Torricelli ===
A disciple of Galileo, Evangelista Torricelli reiterated Aristotle's model involving a gravitational centre, adding his view that a system can only be in equilibrium when the common centre itself is unable to fall.

The relation of the distance of objects in free fall to the square of the time taken was confirmed by Francesco Maria Grimaldi and Giovanni Battista Riccioli between 1640 and 1650. They also made a calculation of the gravity of Earth constant by recording the oscillations of a pendulum.

=== Mechanical explanations ===
In 1644, René Descartes proposed that no empty space can exist and that a continuum of matter causes every motion to be curvilinear. Thus, centrifugal force thrusts relatively light matter away from the central vortices of celestial bodies, lowering density locally and thereby creating centripetal pressure. Using aspects of this theory, between 1669 and 1690, Christiaan Huygens designed a mathematical vortex model. In one of his proofs, he shows that the distance elapsed by an object dropped from a spinning wheel will increase proportionally to the square of the wheel's rotation time. In 1671, Robert Hooke speculated that gravitation is the result of bodies emitting waves in the aether. (Note: James Challis repeated this assumption in 1869.) Nicolas Fatio de Duillier (1690) and Georges-Louis Le Sage (1748) proposed a corpuscular model using some sort of screening or shadowing mechanism. In 1784, Le Sage posited that gravity could be a result of the collision of atoms, and in the early 19th century, he expanded Daniel Bernoulli's theory of corpuscular pressure to the universe as a whole. A similar model was later created by Hendrik Lorentz (1853–1928), who used electromagnetic radiation instead of corpuscles.

English mathematician Isaac Newton used Descartes' argument that curvilinear motion constrains inertia, and in 1675, argued that aether streams attract all bodies to one another. (Note: Bernhard Riemann made a similar argument in 1853.) Newton (1717) and Leonhard Euler (1760) proposed a model in which the aether loses density near mass, leading to a net force acting on bodies. Further mechanical explanations of gravitation (including Le Sage's theory) were created between 1650 and 1900 to explain Newton's theory, but mechanistic models eventually fell out of favor because most of them lead to an unacceptable amount of drag (air resistance), which was not observed. Others violate the energy conservation law and are incompatible with modern thermodynamics.

=== 'Weight' before Newton ===
Before Newton, 'weight' had the double meaning 'amount' and 'heaviness'.

What we now know as mass was until the time of Newton called "weight." ... A goldsmith believed that an ounce of gold was a quantity of gold. ... But the ancients believed that a beam balance also measured "heaviness" which they recognized through their muscular senses. ... Mass and its associated downward force were believed to be the same thing. Kepler formed a [distinct] concept of mass ("amount of matter" (copia materiae), but called it "weight" as did everyone at that time.

— K. M. Browne, The pre-Newtonian meaning of the word "weight"

=== Mass as distinct from weight ===
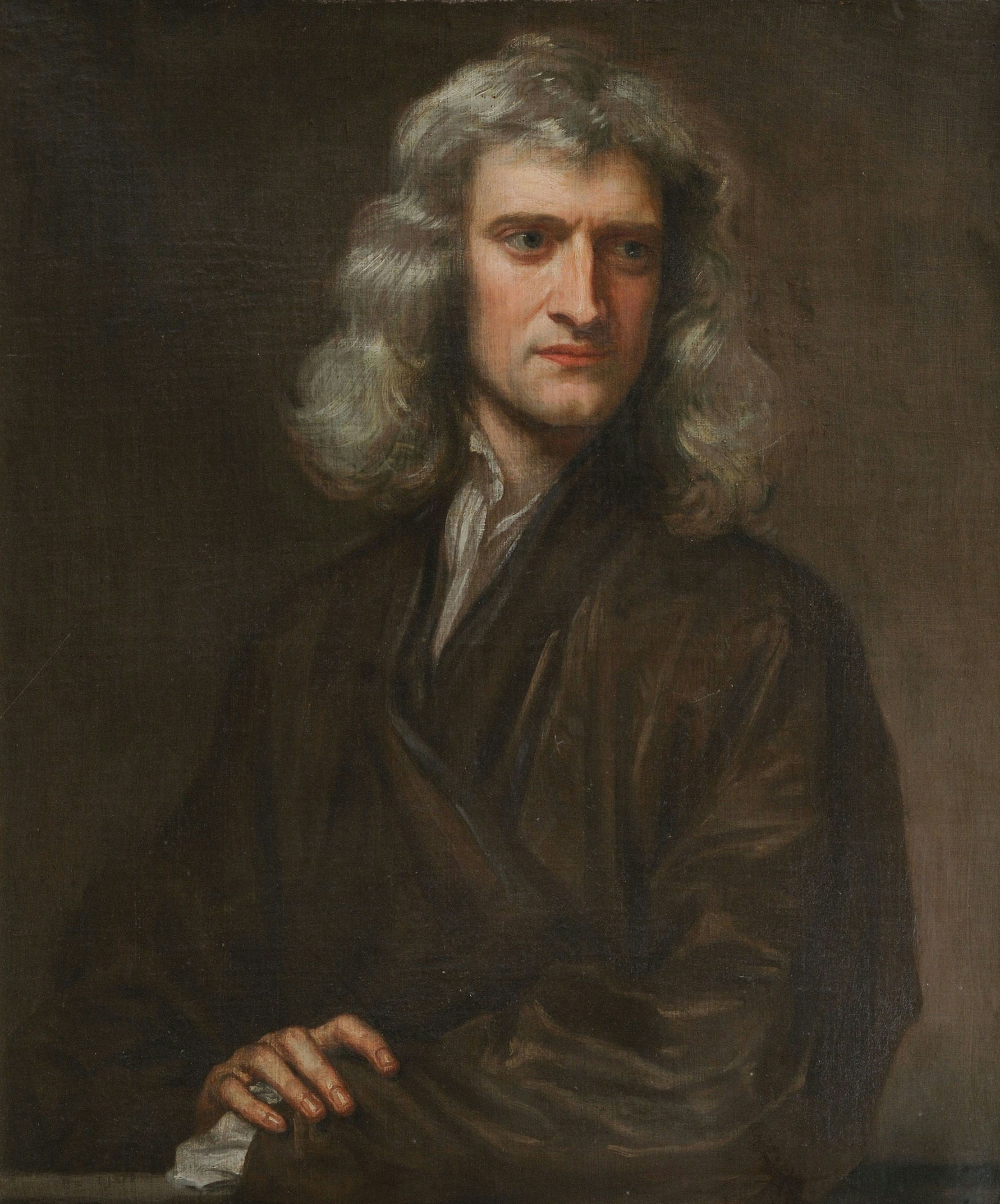
Portrait of Isaac Newton (1642–1727) by Godfrey Kneller (1689)

In 1686, Newton gave the concept of mass its name. In the first paragraph of Principia, Newton defined quantity of matter as "density and bulk conjunctly", and mass as quantity of matter.

The quantity of matter is the measure of the same, arising from its density and bulk conjunctly. ... It is this quantity that I mean hereafter everywhere under the name of body or mass. And the same is known by the weight of each body; for it is proportional to the weight.

— Isaac Newton, Mathematical principles of natural philosophy, Definition I.

=== Newton's law of universal gravitation ===
In 1679, Robert Hooke wrote to Isaac Newton of his hypothesis concerning orbital motion as a combination of tangential inertial motion and a central force. He also asked for the precise trajectory implied an inverse-square force. Newton was almost certainly influenced by this correspondence to do his subsequent work on gravitation, although he denied that Hooke had told him of the inverse-square force. In January 1684 Hooke told Edmond Halley and Christopher Wren that he had proven the inverse-square law of planetary motion but he refused to produce his proof. That summer, Halley visited Newton and asked if Newton knew what trajectory an inverse square force would produce. Newton said an ellipse and by November 1684 he sent Halley De motu corporum in gyrum ('On the motion of bodies in an orbit'), in which he mathematically derives Kepler's laws of planetary motion. In 1687, with Halley's support Newton published Philosophiæ Naturalis Principia Mathematica (Mathematical Principles of Natural Philosophy), which hypothesizes the inverse-square law of universal gravitation. In his own words:

I deduced that the forces which keep the planets in their orbs must be reciprocally as the squares of their distances from the centres about which they revolve; and thereby compared the force requisite to keep the moon in her orb with the force of gravity at the surface of the earth; and found them to answer pretty nearly.

Although Hooke was unable develop a mathematical theory of gravity and work out the consequences, he claimed that the inverse square law portion was his "notion".

Newton's original formula was:

$${\rm Force\,of\,gravity} \propto \frac{\rm mass\,of\,object\,1\,\times\,mass\,of\,object\,2}{\rm distance\,from\,centers^2}$$

where the symbol $\propto$ means "is proportional to". To make this into an equal-sided formula or equation, there needed to be a multiplying factor or constant that would give the correct force of gravity no matter the value of the masses or distance between them – the gravitational constant. Newton would need an accurate measure of this constant to prove his inverse-square law. Reasonably accurate measurements were not available in until the Cavendish experiment by Henry Cavendish in 1797.

In Newton's theory (rewritten using more modern mathematics) the density of mass $\rho\,$ generates a scalar field, the gravitational potential $\varphi\,$ in joules per kilogram, by

$${\partial^2 \varphi \over \partial x^j \, \partial x^j} = 4 \pi G \rho \,.$$

Using the Nabla operator $\nabla$ for the gradient and divergence (partial derivatives), this can be conveniently written as:

$$\nabla^2 \varphi = 4 \pi G \rho \,.$$

This scalar field governs the motion of a free-falling particle by:

$${ d^2x^j\over dt^2} = -{\partial\varphi\over\partial x^j\,}.$$

At distance r from an isolated mass M, the scalar field is

$$\varphi = -\frac{GM} r \,.$$

The Principia sold out quickly, inspiring Newton to publish a second edition in 1713. However the theory of gravity itself was not accepted quickly.

The theory of gravity faced two barriers. First scientists like Gottfried Wilhelm Leibniz complained that it relied on action at a distance, that the mechanism of gravity was "invisible, intangible, and not mechanical". The French philosopher Voltaire countered these concerns, ultimately writing his own book to explain aspects of it to French readers in 1738, which helped to popularize Newton's theory.

Second, detailed comparisons with astronomical data were not initially favorable. Among the most conspicuous issue was the so-called great inequality of Jupiter and Saturn. Comparisons of ancient astronomical observations to those of the early 1700s implied that the orbit of Saturn was increasing in diameter while that of Jupiter was decreasing. Ultimately this meant Saturn would exit the Solar System and Jupiter would collide with other planets or the Sun. The problem was tackled first by Leonhard Euler in 1748, then Joseph-Louis Lagrange in 1763, by Pierre-Simon Laplace in 1773. Each effort improved the mathematical treatment until the issue was resolved by Laplace in 1784 approximately 100 years after Newton's first publication on gravity. Laplace showed that the changes were periodic but with immensely long periods beyond any existing measurements.

Successes such the solution to the great inequality of Jupiter and Saturn mystery accumulated. In 1755, Prussian philosopher Immanuel Kant published a cosmological manuscript based on Newtonian principles, in which he develops an early version of the nebular hypothesis. Edmond Halley proposed that similar looking objects appearing every 76 years was in fact a single comet. The appearance of the comet in 1759, now named after him, within a month of predictions based on Newton's gravity greatly improved scientific opinion of the theory. Newton's theory enjoyed its greatest success when it was used to predict the existence of Neptune based on motions of Uranus that could not be accounted by the actions of the other planets. Calculations by John Couch Adams and Urbain Le Verrier both predicted the general position of the planet. In 1846, Le Verrier sent his position to Johann Gottfried Galle, asking him to verify it. The same night, Galle spotted Neptune near the position Le Verrier had predicted.

Not every comparison was successful. By the end of the 19th century, Le Verrier showed that the orbit of Mercury could not be accounted for entirely under Newtonian gravity, and all searches for another perturbing body (such as a planet orbiting the Sun even closer than Mercury) were fruitless. Even so, Newton's theory is thought to be exceptionally accurate in the limit of weak gravitational fields and low speeds.

At the end of the 19th century, many tried to combine Newton's force law with the established laws of electrodynamics (like those of Wilhelm Eduard Weber, Carl Friedrich Gauss, and Bernhard Riemann) to explain the anomalous perihelion precession of Mercury. In 1890, Maurice Lévy succeeded in doing so by combining the laws of Weber and Riemann, whereby the speed of gravity is equal to the speed of light. In another attempt, Paul Gerber (1898) succeeded in deriving the correct formula for the perihelion shift (which was identical to the formula later used by Albert Einstein). These hypotheses were rejected because of the outdated laws they were based on, being superseded by those of James Clerk Maxwell.

== Modern era ==
In 1900, Hendrik Lorentz tried to explain gravity on the basis of his ether theory and Maxwell's equations. He assumed, like Ottaviano Fabrizio Mossotti and Johann Karl Friedrich Zöllner, that the attraction of opposite charged particles is stronger than the repulsion of equal charged particles. The resulting net force is exactly what is known as universal gravitation, in which the speed of gravity is that of light. Lorentz calculated that the value for the perihelion advance of Mercury was much too low.

In the late 19th century, Lord Kelvin pondered the possibility of a theory of everything. He proposed that every body pulsates, which might be an explanation of gravitation and electric charges. His ideas were largely mechanistic and required the existence of the aether, which the Michelson–Morley experiment failed to detect in 1887. This, combined with Mach's principle, led to gravitational models which feature action at a distance.

Albert Einstein developed his revolutionary theory of relativity in papers published in 1905 and 1915; these account for the perihelion precession of Mercury. In 1914, Gunnar Nordström attempted to unify gravity and electromagnetism in his theory of five-dimensional gravitation. (Note: In string theory, dimensions exceeding four allow for the existence of parallel realities—which along with the anthropic principle, help to explain the statistical near-impossibility of our fine-tuned universe.) General relativity was proven in 1919, when Arthur Eddington observed gravitational lensing around a solar eclipse, matching Einstein's equations. This resulted in Einstein's theory superseding Newtonian physics. Thereafter, German mathematician Theodor Kaluza promoted the idea of general relativity with a fifth dimension, which in 1921 Swedish physicist Oskar Klein gave a physical interpretation of in a prototypical string theory, a possible model of quantum gravity and potential theory of everything.

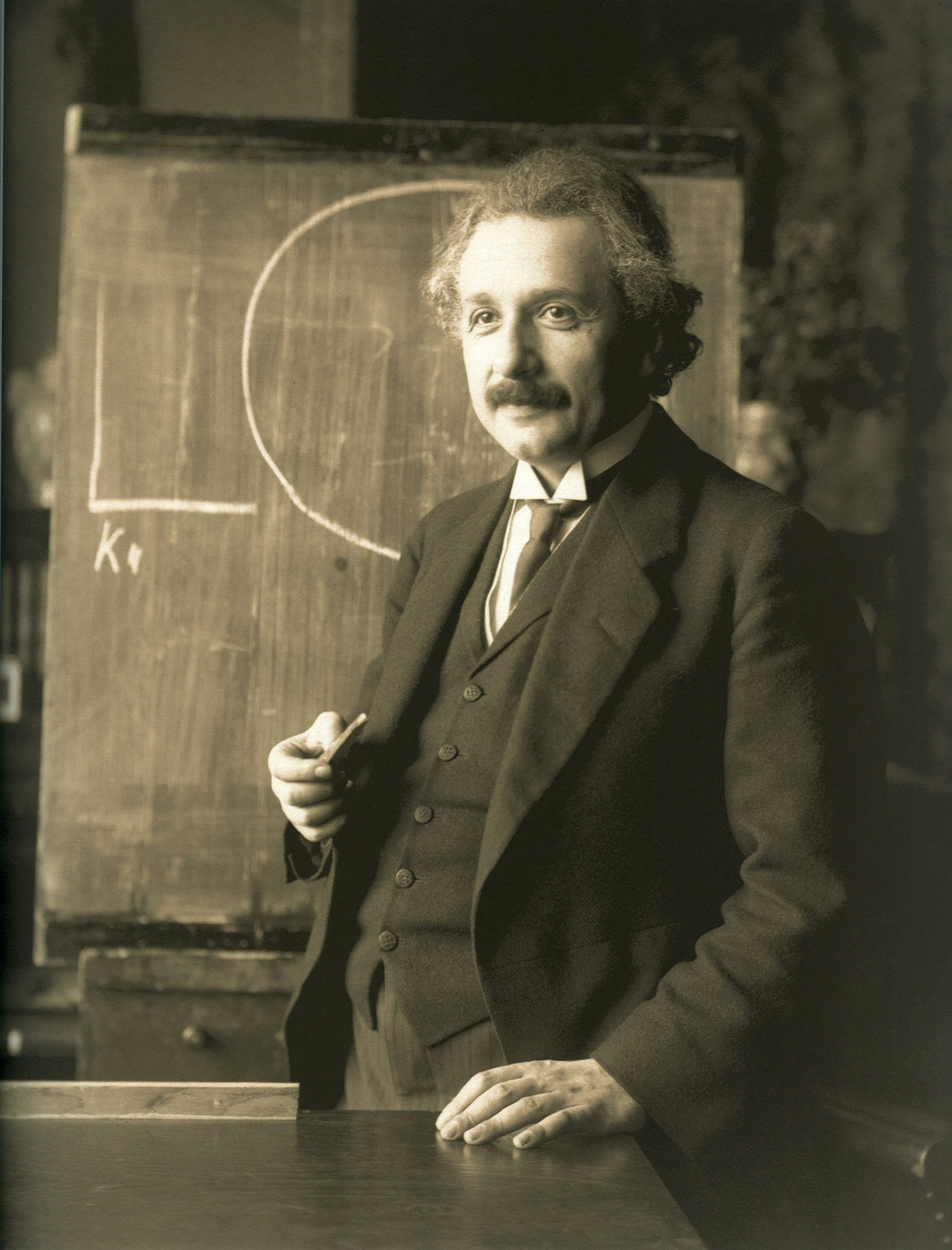
Albert Einstein in 1921

Einstein's field equations include a cosmological constant to account for the alleged staticity of the universe. However, Edwin Hubble observed in 1929 that the universe appears to be expanding. By the 1930s, Paul Dirac developed the hypothesis that gravitation should slowly and steadily decrease over the course of the history of the universe. Alan Guth and Alexei Starobinsky proposed in 1980 that cosmic inflation in the very early universe could have been driven by a negative pressure field, a concept later coined 'dark energy'—found in 2013 to have composed around 68.3% of the early universe.

In 1922, Jacobus Kapteyn proposed the existence of dark matter, an unseen force that moves stars in galaxies at higher velocities than gravity alone accounts for. It was found in 2013 to have comprised 26.8% of the early universe. Along with dark energy, dark matter is an outlier in Einstein's relativity, and an explanation for its apparent effects is a requirement for a successful theory of everything.

In 1957, Hermann Bondi proposed that negative gravitational mass (combined with negative inertial mass) would comply with the strong equivalence principle of general relativity and Newton's laws of motion. Bondi's proof yielded singularity-free solutions for the relativity equations.

Early theories of gravity attempted to explain planetary orbits (Newton) and more complicated orbits (e.g. Lagrange). Then came unsuccessful attempts to combine gravity and either wave or corpuscular theories of gravity. The whole landscape of physics was changed with the discovery of Lorentz transformations, and this led to attempts to reconcile it with gravity. At the same time, experimental physicists started testing the foundations of gravity and relativity—Lorentz invariance, the gravitational deflection of light, the Eötvös experiment. These considerations led to and past the development of general relativity.

=== Einstein (1905–1912) ===
In 1905, Albert Einstein published a series of papers in which he established the special theory of relativity and the fact that mass and energy are equivalent. In 1907, in what he described as "the happiest thought of my life", Einstein realized that someone who is in free fall experiences no gravitational field. In other words, gravitation is exactly equivalent to acceleration.

Einstein's two-part publication in 1912 (and before in 1908) is really only important for historical reasons. By then he knew of the gravitational redshift and the deflection of light. He had realized that Lorentz transformations are not generally applicable, but retained them. The theory states that the speed of light is constant in free space but varies in the presence of matter. The theory was only expected to hold when the source of the gravitational field is stationary. It includes the principle of least action:

$$\delta \int d\tau = 0\,$$

$${d\tau}^2 = - \eta_{\mu \nu} \, dx^\mu \, dx^\nu \,$$

where $\eta_{\mu \nu} \,$ is the Minkowski metric, and there is a summation from 1 to 4 over indices $\mu \,$ and $\nu \,$.

Einstein and Grossmann includes Riemannian geometry and tensor calculus.

$$\delta \int d\tau = 0 \,$$

$${d\tau}^2 = - g_{\mu \nu} \, dx^\mu \, dx^\nu \,$$

The equations of electrodynamics exactly match those of general relativity. The equation

$$T^{\mu \nu} = \rho {dx^\mu \over d\tau} {dx^\nu \over d\tau} \,$$

is not in general relativity. It expresses the stress–energy tensor as a function of the matter density.

=== Lorentz-invariant models (1905–1910) ===
Based on the principle of relativity, Henri Poincaré (1905, 1906), Hermann Minkowski (1908), and Arnold Sommerfeld (1910) tried to modify Newton's theory and to establish a Lorentz invariant gravitational law, in which the speed of gravity is that of light. As in Lorentz's model, the value for the perihelion advance of Mercury was much too low.

=== Abraham (1912) ===
Meanwhile, Max Abraham developed an alternative model of gravity in which the speed of light depends on the gravitational field strength and so is variable almost everywhere. Abraham's 1914 review of gravitation models is said to be excellent, but his own model was poor.

=== Nordström (1912) ===
The first approach of Nordström (1912) was to retain the Minkowski metric and a constant value of $c\,$ but to let mass depend on the gravitational field strength $\varphi\,$. Allowing this field strength to satisfy

$$\Box \varphi = \rho \,$$

where $\rho \,$ is rest mass energy and $\Box \,$ is the d'Alembertian,

$$m = m_0 \exp\left( \frac \varphi {c^2} \right) \,$$

where $m_0$ is the mass when gravitational potential vanishes and,

$$- {\partial \varphi \over \partial x^\mu} = \dot{u}_\mu + {u_\mu \over c^2 \dot{\varphi}} \,$$

where $u \,$ is the four-velocity and the dot is a differential with respect to time.

The second approach of Nordström (1913) is remembered as the first logically consistent relativistic field theory of gravitation ever formulated. (notation from Pais not Nordström):

$$\delta \int \psi \, d\tau = 0 \,$$

$${d\tau}^2 = - \eta_{\mu \nu} \, dx^\mu \, dx^\nu \,$$

where $\psi \,$ is a scalar field,

$$- {\partial T^{\mu \nu} \over \partial x^\nu} = T {1 \over \psi} {\partial \psi \over \partial x_\mu} \,$$

This theory is Lorentz invariant, satisfies the conservation laws, correctly reduces to the Newtonian limit and satisfies the weak equivalence principle.

=== Einstein and Fokker (1914) ===
This theory is Einstein's first treatment of gravitation in which general covariance is strictly obeyed. Writing:

$$\delta \int ds = 0 \,$$

$${ds}^2 = g_{\mu \nu} \, dx^\mu \, dx^\nu \,$$

$$g_{\mu \nu} = \psi^2 \eta_{\mu \nu} \,$$

they relate Einstein–Grossmann to Nordström. They also state:

$$T \, \propto \, R \,.$$

That is, the trace of the stress energy tensor is proportional to the curvature of space.

Between 1911 and 1915, Einstein developed the idea that gravitation is equivalent to acceleration, initially stated as the equivalence principle, into his general theory of relativity, which fuses the three dimensions of space and the one dimension of time into the four-dimensional fabric of spacetime. However, it does not unify gravity with quanta—individual particles of energy, which Einstein himself had postulated the existence of in 1905.

=== General relativity ===
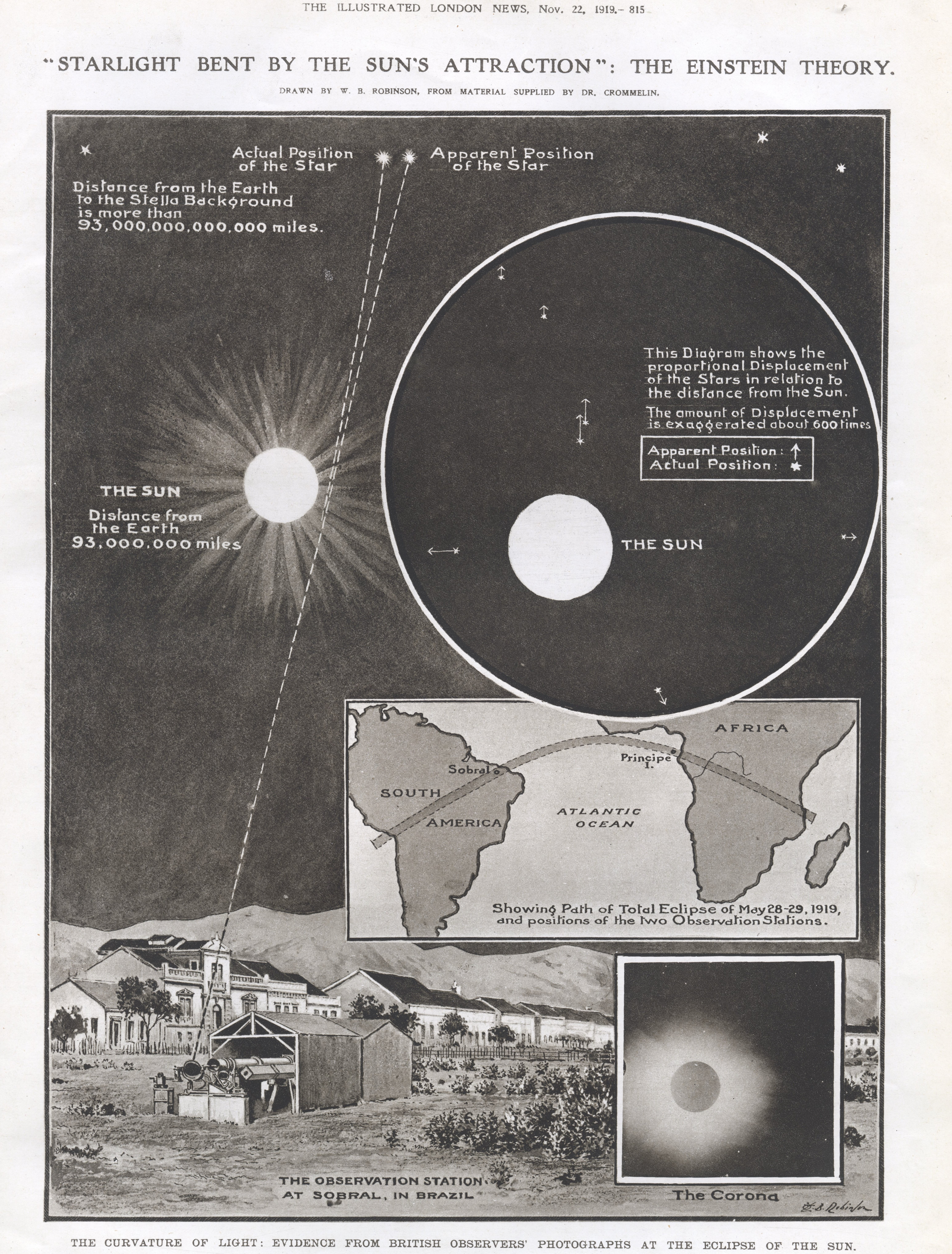
Illustration explaining the relevance of the total solar eclipse of 29 May 1919, from the 22 November 1919 edition of The Illustrated London News

In general relativity, the effects of gravitation are ascribed to spacetime curvature instead of to a force. The starting point for general relativity is the equivalence principle, which equates free fall with inertial motion. The issue that this creates is that free-falling objects can accelerate with respect to each other. To deal with this difficulty, Einstein proposed that spacetime is curved by matter, and that free-falling objects are moving along locally straight paths in curved spacetime. More specifically, Einstein and David Hilbert discovered the field equations of general relativity, which relate the presence of matter and the curvature of spacetime. These field equations are a set of 10 simultaneous, non-linear, differential equations. The solutions of the field equations are the components of the metric tensor of spacetime, which describes its geometry. The geodesic paths of spacetime are calculated from the metric tensor.

Notable solutions of the Einstein field equations include:

- The Schwarzschild solution, which describes spacetime surrounding a spherically symmetrical non-rotating uncharged massive object. For objects with radii smaller than the Schwarzschild radius, this solution generates a black hole with a central singularity.
- The Reissner–Nordström solution, in which the central object has an electrical charge. For charges with a geometrized length less than the geometrized length of the mass of the object, this solution produces black holes with an event horizon surrounding a Cauchy horizon.
- The Kerr solution for rotating massive objects. This solution also produces black holes with multiple horizons.
- The cosmological Robertson–Walker solution (from 1922 and 1924), which predicts the expansion of the universe.

General relativity has enjoyed much success because its predictions (not called for by older theories of gravity) have been regularly confirmed. For example:

- General relativity accounts for the anomalous perihelion precession of Mercury.
- Gravitational lensing was first confirmed in 1919, and has more recently been strongly confirmed through the use of a quasar which passes behind the Sun as seen from the Earth.
- The expansion of the universe (predicted by the Robertson–Walker metric) was confirmed by Edwin Hubble in 1929.
- The prediction that time runs slower at lower potentials has been confirmed by the Pound–Rebka experiment, the Hafele–Keating experiment, and the GPS.
- The time delay of light passing close to a massive object was first identified by Irwin Shapiro in 1964 in interplanetary spacecraft signals.
- Gravitational radiation has been indirectly confirmed through studies of binary pulsars such as PSR 1913+16.
  - In 2015, the LIGO experiments directly detected gravitational radiation from two colliding black holes, making this the first direct observation of both gravitational waves and black holes.

It is believed that neutron star mergers (since detected in 2017) and black hole formation may also create detectable amounts of gravitational radiation.

=== Quantum gravity ===
Several decades after the discovery of general relativity, it was realized that it cannot be the complete theory of gravity because it is incompatible with quantum mechanics. Later it was understood that it is possible to describe gravity in the framework of quantum field theory like the other fundamental forces. In this framework, the attractive force of gravity arises due to exchange of virtual gravitons, in the same way as the electromagnetic force arises from exchange of virtual photons. This reproduces general relativity in the classical limit, but only at the linearized level and postulating that the conditions for the applicability of Ehrenfest theorem holds, which is not always the case. Moreover, this approach fails at short distances of the order of the Planck length.

== See also ==
- Anti-gravity
- History of physics
