= Glad Rag Doll =

1928 song written by Milton Ager, Dan Doougherty and Jack Yellen

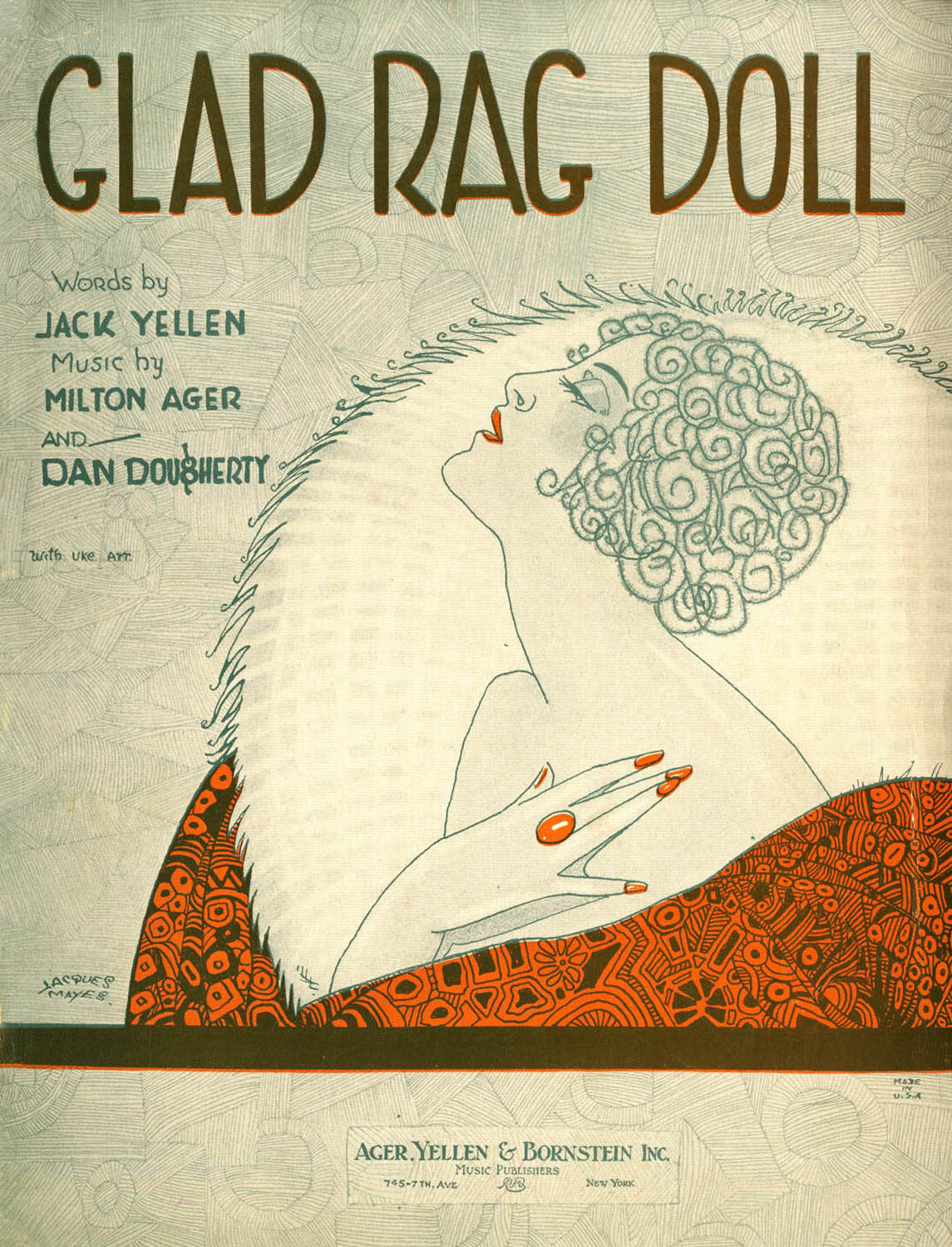
Sheet music cover, 1928

"Glad Rag Doll" is a 1928 song composed by Milton Ager and Dan Dougherty with lyrics by Jack Yellen. It was Ager and Yellen's first movie theme song, written for the motion picture of the same name (released in 1929) starring Dolores Costello.

Early important recordings of the song include those by:

- Ted Lewis and His Band (1928)
- Arthur Briggs and His Boys (1929)
- Earl "Fatha" Hines (1929)
- Tommy Dorsey
- Ruth Etting

The German group The Comedian Harmonists recorded this song in 1929 in a German version called "Du armes Girl vom Chor"

Additional later recordings include those by:

- Johnnie Ray (1954)
- Kay Starr (1955)
- Barbara Cook (1975)
- Joyce Moody and Earl Wentz (2007)
- Diana Krall (2012)

Pianist Dagmar Nordstrom created an early piano roll of the song for Steinway in the 1920s.
