= Norström =

Norström is a surname of Swedish origin and may refer to:

- Mattias Norström (born 1972), Swedish ice hockey player

== See also ==
- Norrström, a river in Stockholm, Sweden
- Nordstrom (disambiguation)
