= Siggie Nordstrom =

American singer

- Born: Sigfred Ann Nordstrom; June 14, 1893; Chicago, Illinois, United States
- Died: December 24, 1980 (aged 87)
- Genres: Pop
- Occupations: Model, actress, entertainer, socialite, singer

Sigfred Ann "Siggie" Nordstrom (June 14, 1893 – December 24, 1980) was an American model, actress, entertainer, socialite and lead singer of The Nordstrom Sisters.

Born in Chicago in 1893 and nicknamed "Siggie", she was the elder daughter of Anna and Alexander Nordstrom. She started out as a hat model in Chicago. First coming to New York City to take a part in Very Good Eddie on Broadway, she retired from show business during her marriage.

The AP picked up on a photograph of her on the ice of Lake Michigan, naming her 'Queen of the Polar Bears'. Her future husband saw the photograph and she always said, "That photograph 'got' my husband!" She married the head of the Sweets Company of America, (which made the Tootsie Roll), Samuel Ferebee Williams. When he died in 1931, she began performing with her younger sister Dagmar.

They sublet a flat in London for a year in 1939 when they were the resident performers at The Ritz. Shortly after their return to the United States, her sister's song "Remembering You" was published both as sheet music and the full orchestration.

With the exception of their October in Bad Gastein for the baths, they regularly performed either in clubs in New York City or on board transatlantic ocean liners. During the Second World War, they took provisions in their car to Norway and Sweden. During the 1940s, they were often on the radio and through the 1960s, when they were not otherwise engaged as a team, Dagmar would at times take an assignment alone playing in a club.

Siggie was the story teller and kept the 'oral history' alive. She loved to tell of their return from Havana, both with dark tans and wearing all-white, spaghetti-strap long gowns, when as they were being shown to their table at Casino in the Park as the Tavern on the Green was then known, Eddie Duchin looked up from the keyboard, stopped playing, and applauded. Another frequently told story took place toward the end of World War II, when Dagmar had driven them, at some risk, through the Norwegian mountains after delivering supplies when Perle Mesta greeted them, saying, "My hat's off to you girls!"

They maintained an active social life and were the toast of many private parties in New York City until Dagmar's death in 1976. Fracturing a hip in 1977 led to six months rehab in Annapolis, Maryland. She returned to the city and held several large parties, but her mobility limited her increasingly and in 1980 she moved in with "adopted" nephew, David McJonathan-Swarm and his family, in Jefferson, Maryland.

== Death ==
She died on Christmas Eve 1980, was cremated and interred with a memorial to both sisters at Resthaven Memorial Gardens, Frederick County, Maryland.
