= Dagmar Nordstrom =

American singer-songwriter

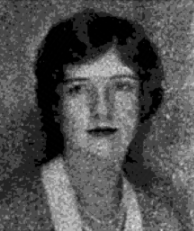

Background information
- Born: December 12, 1903; Chicago, Illinois, United States
- Died: April 9, 1976 (aged 72); New York City, United States
- Genres: Cabaret
- Occupation(s): Composer, pianist, singer
- Instrument: Piano

Dagmar Nordstrom (December 12, 1903 – April 9, 1976) was an American composer, pianist and singer. She performed together with her sister Siggie as a cabaret singing duo known as The Nordstrom Sisters.

== Background ==
Dagmar Nordstrom was born in Chicago, Illinois. She was the second daughter of Anna and Alexander Nordstrom. The family were of Swedish and Norwegian extraction. Dagmar was married briefly to a society playboy, but lived most of her life with her older sister after the death of Siggie's husband, Samuel Ferebee Williams.

== Career ==
Dagmar and Siggie had a flat in London for a year in 1939 when they were the resident performers at The Ritz. With the exception of their October trips to Bad Gastein for the baths, they regularly performed either in clubs in New York City or on board transatlantic ocean liners, most commonly on the Cunard Line and Norwegian America Line. The duo were on the maiden around the world voyage of the combined ocean liner/cruise ship MS Sagafjord.

Dagmar wrote the music for "Remembering You", a foxtrot which was published as sheet music and a full orchestration in 1940. During the 1940s she and her sister were often on the radio and through the 1960s when they were not otherwise engaged as a team, Dagmar would at times take an assignment alone playing in a club.

== Musical selection ==
During the 1920s she cut piano rolls for the Aeolian Company's Duo-Art reproducing piano. These included:

- "I Still Love You" (by Milton Ager)
- "If You Don't Love Me" (by Yellen-Ager)
- "Happy Days and Lonely Nights"
- "Sweet Dreams" (Ager)
- "Are You Happy?" (Ager)
- "Blue River"
- "Glad Rag Doll" (by Yellen-Ager-Dougherty)
- "That's the Good Old Sunny South"

== Later years ==
The sisters maintained an active social life and were the toast of many private parties in New York City until her death in 1976 when she suffered a massive stroke. Several good friends, including the photographer Edgar de Evia, arrived for dinner and she was reclined in their living room, her mind still clear, saying "Oh, my dear boys, I believe that I've had a stroke." She died that night, aged 72. Following services at the Frank E. Campbell Funeral Home, she was cremated and interred with her mother in the mausoleum at Ferncliff Cemetery, Westchester County, New York.
