= Nordstrom Sisters =

American cabaret act

The Nordstrom Sisters were an American cabaret act known for their performances from 1931 to 1976.

== Sisters ==
Originally from Chicago, the sisters were of Swedish and Norwegian origin. They were frequently billed as society performers. As international cabaret singers, they were often styled as The Misses Nordstrom or introduced as those Park Avenue darlings, the Nordstrom Sisters. Their songs usually contained sexual innuendos and double entendres.

The youngest sister, Dagmar Nordstrom (1903–1976), worked as the duo's composer, arranger, and pianist.

The elder sister, Sigfred Nordstrom (1893–1980), sang the lead. She was the widow of Samuel Ferebee Williams (1883–1931), a confectionery executive who originated the Tootsie Roll. They were married in 1919. Williams died in October 1931.

== Performances ==
The pair lived in London for a year in 1939 and were the resident performers at The Ritz. They were often featured onboard transatlantic ocean liners, preferring the Norwegian America Line and the Cunard Line. They were always booked in first-class staterooms and took their automobile aboard ship as part of their compensation package, celebrating as the cars were first out of the hold of the ship. Everything they needed on the continent was packed in the car, and they were on their way as others were still waiting for their trunks. They sailed on the MS Sagafjord for her maiden round-the-world voyage. They always spent the month of October in Bad Gastein for the baths.

They entertained groups of 50-100 guests for cocktails for several nights to celebrate each of their birthdays and during the December and New Year holidays. Initially, they had an apartment floor in Manhattan on 53rd Street, just east of Park Avenue. When that building was demolished for a new Chemical Bank building, they, as Siggie used to say, moved to 'Albany' as the new apartment was on the northwest corner of 79th Street at Third Avenue.
