= Nordström's theory of gravitation =

Predecessor to the theory of relativity

In theoretical physics, Nordström's theory of gravitation was a predecessor of general relativity. Strictly speaking, there were actually two distinct theories proposed by the Finnish theoretical physicist Gunnar Nordström, in 1912 and 1913, respectively. The first was quickly dismissed, but the second became the first known example of a metric theory of gravitation, in which the effects of gravitation are treated entirely in terms of the geometry of a curved spacetime.

Neither of Nordström's theories are in agreement with observation and experiment. Nonetheless, the first remains of interest insofar as it led to the second. The second remains of interest both as an important milestone on the road to the current theory of gravitation, general relativity, and as a simple example of a self-consistent relativistic theory of gravitation. As an example, this theory is particularly useful in the context of pedagogical discussions of how to derive and test the predictions of a metric theory of gravitation.

== Development of the theories ==
=== Background ===
Nordström's theories arose at a time when several leading physicists, including Nordström in Helsinki, Max Abraham in Milan, Gustav Mie in Greifswald, Germany, and Albert Einstein in Prague, were all trying to create competing relativistic theories of gravitation.

All of these researchers began by trying to suitably modify the existing theory, the field theory version of Newton's theory of gravitation. In this theory, the field equation is the Poisson equation

$$\Delta \phi = 4 \pi \rho$$,

where $\phi$ is the gravitational potential and $\rho$ is the density of matter, augmented by an equation of motion for a test particle in an ambient gravitational field, which we can derive from Newton's force law and which states that the acceleration of the test particle is given by the gradient of the potential

$$\frac{d \vec{u}}{dt} = -\nabla \phi$$

This theory is not relativistic because the equation of motion refers to coordinate time rather than proper time, and because, should the matter in some isolated object suddenly be redistributed by an explosion, the field equation requires that the potential everywhere in "space" must be "updated" instantaneously, which violates the principle that any "news" which has a physical effect (in this case, an effect on test particle motion far from the source of the field) cannot be transmitted faster than the speed of light. Einstein's former calculus professor, Hermann Minkowski had sketched a vector theory of gravitation as early as 1908, but in 1912, Abraham pointed out that no such theory would admit stable planetary orbits. This was one reason why Nordström turned to scalar theories of gravitation (while Einstein explored tensor theories).

=== First theory ===
Nordström's first attempt to propose a suitable relativistic scalar field equation of gravitation was the simplest and most natural choice imaginable: simply replace the Laplacian in the Newtonian field equation with the D'Alembertian or wave operator, which gives

$$\Box \phi = 4 \pi \, \rho$$.

This has the result of changing the vacuum field equation from the Laplace equation to the wave equation, which means that any "news" concerning redistribution of matter in one location is transmitted at the speed of light to other locations. Correspondingly, the simplest guess for a suitable equation of motion for test particles might seem to be $\dot{u}_a = -\phi_{,a}$ where the dot signifies differentiation with respect to proper time, subscripts following the comma denote partial differentiation with respect to the indexed coordinate, and where $u^a$ is the velocity four-vector of the test particle. This force law had earlier been proposed by Abraham, but it does not preserve the norm of the four-velocity as is required by the definition of proper time, so Nordström instead proposed $\dot{u}_a = -\phi_{,a} - \dot{\phi} \, u_a$.

However, this theory is unacceptable for a variety of reasons. Two objections are theoretical. First, this theory is not derivable from a Lagrangian, unlike the Newtonian field theory (or most metric theories of gravitation). Second, the proposed field equation is linear. But by analogy with electromagnetism, we should expect the gravitational field to carry energy, and on the basis of Einstein's work on relativity theory, we should expect this energy to be equivalent to mass and therefore, to gravitate. This implies that the field equation should be nonlinear. Another objection is more practical: this theory disagrees drastically with observation.

Einstein and von Laue proposed that the problem might lie with the field equation, which, they suggested, should have the linear form $F T_{\rm matter} = \rho$, where F is some yet unknown function of $\phi$, and where T_{matter} is the trace of the stress–energy tensor describing the density, momentum, and stress of any matter present.

=== Second theory ===
In response to these criticisms, Nordström proposed his second theory in 1913. From the proportionality of inertial and gravitational mass, he deduced that the field equation should be $\phi \, \Box \phi = -4 \pi \, T_{\rm matter}$, which is nonlinear. Nordström now took the equation of motion to be

$$\frac{d \left( \phi \, u_a \right)}{ds} = -\phi_{,a}$$

or $\phi \, \dot{u}_a = -\phi_{,a} - \dot{\phi} \, u_a$.

Einstein took the first opportunity to proclaim his approval of the new theory. In a keynote address to the annual meeting of the Society of German Scientists and Physicians, given in Vienna on September 23, 1913, Einstein surveyed the state of the art, declaring that only his own work with Marcel Grossmann and the second theory of Nordström were worthy of consideration. (Mie, who was in the audience, rose to protest, but Einstein explained his criteria and Mie was forced to admit that his own theory did not meet them.) Einstein considered the special case when the only matter present is a cloud of dust (that is, a perfect fluid in which the pressure is assumed to be negligible). He argued that the contribution of this matter to the stress–energy tensor should be:

$$\left( T_{\rm matter} \right)_{ab} = \phi \, \rho \, u_a \, u_b$$

He then derived an expression for the stress–energy tensor of the gravitational field in Nordström's second theory,

$$4 \pi \, \left( T_{\rm grav} \right)_{ab} = \phi_{,a} \, \phi_{,b} - 1/2 \, \eta_{ab} \, \phi_{,m} \, \phi^{,m}$$

which he proposed should hold in general, and showed that the sum of the contributions to the stress–energy tensor from the gravitational field energy and from matter would be conserved, as should be the case. Furthermore, he showed, the field equation of Nordström's second theory follows from the Lagrangian

$$L = \frac{1}{8 \pi} \, \eta^{ab} \, \phi_{,a} \, \phi_{,b} - \rho \, \phi$$

Since Nordström's equation of motion for test particles in an ambient gravitational field also follows from a Lagrangian, this shows that Nordström's second theory can be derived from an action principle and also shows that it obeys other properties we must demand from a self-consistent field theory.

Meanwhile, a gifted Dutch student, Adriaan Fokker had written a Ph.D. thesis under Hendrik Lorentz in which he derived what is now called the Fokker–Planck equation. Lorentz, delighted by his former student's success, arranged for Fokker to pursue post-doctoral study with Einstein in Prague. The result was a historic paper which appeared in 1914, in which Einstein and Fokker observed that the Lagrangian for Nordström's equation of motion for test particles, $L = \phi^2 \, \eta_{ab} \, \dot{u}^a \, \dot{u}^b$, is the geodesic Lagrangian for a curved Lorentzian manifold with metric tensor $g_{ab} = \phi^2 \, \eta_{ab}$. If we adopt Cartesian coordinates with line element $d\sigma^2 = \eta_{ab} \, dx^a \, dx^b$ with corresponding wave operator $\Box$ on the flat background, or Minkowski spacetime, so that the line element of the curved spacetime is $ds^2 = \phi^2 \, \eta_{ab} \, dx^a \, dx^b$, then the Ricci scalar of this curved spacetime is just

$$R = -\frac{6 \, \Box \phi}{\phi^3}$$

Therefore, Nordström's field equation becomes simply

$$R = 24 \pi \, T$$

where on the right hand side, we have taken the trace of the stress–energy tensor (with contributions from matter plus any non-gravitational fields) using the metric tensor $g_{ab}$. This is a historic result, because here for the first time we have a field equation in which on the left hand side stands a purely geometrical quantity (the Ricci scalar is the trace of the Ricci tensor, which is itself a kind of trace of the fourth rank Riemann curvature tensor), and on the right hand stands a purely physical quantity, the trace of the stress–energy tensor. Einstein gleefully pointed out that this equation now takes the form which he had earlier proposed with von Laue, and gives a concrete example of a class of theories which he had studied with Grossmann.

Some time later, Hermann Weyl introduced the Weyl curvature tensor $C_{abcd}$, which measures the deviation of a Lorentzian manifold from being conformally flat, i.e. with metric tensor having the form of the product of some scalar function with the metric tensor of flat spacetime. This is exactly the special form of the metric proposed in Nordström's second theory, so the entire content of this theory can be summarized in the following two equations:

$$R = 24 \pi \, T, \; \; \; C_{abcd} = 0$$

== Features of Nordström's theory ==
Einstein was attracted to Nordström's second theory by its simplicity. The vacuum field equations in Nordström's theory are simply

$$R = 0, \; \; \; C_{abcd} = 0$$

We can immediately write down the general vacuum solution in Nordström's theory:

$$ds^2 = \exp (2 \psi) \, \eta_{ab} \, dx^a \, dx^b, \; \; \; \Box \psi = 0$$

where $\phi = \exp(\psi)$ and $d\sigma^2 = \eta_{ab} \, dx^a \, dx^b$ is the line element for flat spacetime in any convenient coordinate chart (such as cylindrical, polar spherical, or double null coordinates), and where $\Box$ is the ordinary wave operator on flat spacetime (expressed in cylindrical, polar spherical, or double null coordinates, respectively). But the general solution of the ordinary three-dimensional wave equation is well known, and can be given rather explicit form. Specifically, for certain charts such as cylindrical or polar spherical charts on flat spacetime (which induce corresponding charts on our curved Lorentzian manifold), we can write the general solution in terms of a power series, and we can write the general solution of certain Cauchy problems in the manner familiar from the Lienard-Wiechert potentials in electromagnetism.

In any solution to Nordström's field equations (vacuum or otherwise), if we consider $\psi$ as controlling a conformal perturbation from flat spacetime, then to first order in $\psi$ we have

$$ds^2 = \exp(2 \, \psi) \, \eta_{ab} \, dx^a \, dx^b \approx (1 + 2 \psi) \, \eta_{ab} \, dx^a \, dx^b$$

Thus, in the weak field approximation, we can identify $\psi$ with the Newtonian gravitational potential, and we can regard it as controlling a small conformal perturbation from a flat spacetime background.

In any metric theory of gravitation, all gravitational effects arise from the curvature of the metric. In a spacetime model in Nordström's theory (but not in general relativity), this depends only on the trace of the stress–energy tensor. But the field energy of an electromagnetic field contributes a term to the stress–energy tensor which is traceless, so in Nordström's theory, electromagnetic field energy does not gravitate! Indeed, since every solution to the field equations of this theory is a spacetime which is among other things conformally equivalent to flat spacetime, null geodesics must agree with the null geodesics of the flat background, so this theory can exhibit no light bending.

Incidentally, the fact that the trace of the stress–energy tensor for an electrovacuum solution (a solution in which there is no matter present, nor any non-gravitational fields except for an electromagnetic field) vanishes shows that in the general electrovacuum solution in Nordström's theory, the metric tensor has the same form as in a vacuum solution, so we need only write down and solve the curved spacetime Maxwell field equations. But these are conformally invariant, so we can also write down the general electrovacuum solution, say in terms of a power series.

In any Lorentzian manifold (with appropriate tensor fields describing any matter and physical fields) which stands as a solution to Nordström's field equations, the conformal part of the Riemann tensor (i.e. the Weyl tensor) always vanishes. The Ricci scalar also vanishes identically in any vacuum region (or even, any region free of matter but containing an electromagnetic field). Are there any further restrictions on the Riemann tensor in Nordström's theory?

To find out, note that an important identity from the theory of manifolds, the Ricci decomposition, splits the Riemann tensor into three pieces, which are each fourth-rank tensors, built out of, respectively, the Ricci scalar, the trace-free Ricci tensor

$$S_{ab} = R_{ab} - \frac{1}{4} \, R \, g_{ab}$$

and the Weyl tensor. It immediately follows that Nordström's theory leaves the trace-free Ricci tensor entirely unconstrained by algebraic relations (other than the symmetric property, which this second rank tensor always enjoys). But taking account of the twice-contracted and detracted Bianchi identity, a differential identity which holds for the Riemann tensor in any (semi)-Riemannian manifold, we see that in Nordström's theory, as a consequence of the field equations, we have the first-order covariant differential equation

$${{S_a}^b}_{;b} = 6 \, \pi \, T_{;a}$$

which constrains the semi-traceless part of the Riemann tensor (the one built out of the trace-free Ricci tensor).

Thus, according to Nordström's theory, in a vacuum region only the semi-traceless part of the Riemann tensor can be nonvanishing. Then our covariant differential constraint on $S_{ab}$ shows how variations in the trace of the stress–energy tensor in our spacetime model can generate a nonzero trace-free Ricci tensor, and thus nonzero semi-traceless curvature, which can propagate into a vacuum region. This is critically important, because otherwise gravitation would not, according to this theory, be a long-range force capable of propagating through a vacuum.

In general relativity, something somewhat analogous happens, but there it is the Ricci tensor which vanishes in any vacuum region (but not in a region which is matter-free but contains an electromagnetic field), and it is the Weyl curvature which is generated (via another first order covariant differential equation) by variations in the stress–energy tensor and which then propagates into vacuum regions, rendering gravitation a long-range force capable of propagating through a vacuum.

We can tabulate the most basic differences between Nordström's theory and general relativity, as follows:

Comparison of Nordström's theory with General Relativity
	type of curvature	Nordström	Einstein
$R$	scalar	vanishes in electrovacuum	vanishes in electrovacuum
$S_{ab}$	once traceless	nonzero for gravitational radiation	vanishes in vacuum
$C_{abcd}$	completely traceless	vanishes always	nonzero for gravitational radiation

Another feature of Nordström's theory is that it can be written as the theory of a certain scalar field in Minkowski spacetime, and in this form enjoys the expected conservation law for nongravitational mass-energy together with gravitational field energy, but suffers from a not very memorable force law. In the curved spacetime formulation the motion of test particles is described (the world line of a free test particle is a timelike geodesic, and by an obvious limit, the world line of a laser pulse is a null geodesic), but we lose the conservation law. So which interpretation is correct? In other words, which metric is the one which according to Nordström can be measured locally by physical experiments? The answer is: the curved spacetime is the physically observable one in this theory (as in all metric theories of gravitation); the flat background is a mere mathematical fiction which is, however, of inestimable value for such purposes as writing down the general vacuum solution, or studying the weak field limit.

At this point, we could show that in the limit of slowly moving test particles and slowly evolving weak gravitational fields, Nordström's theory of gravitation reduces to the Newtonian theory of gravitation. Rather than showing this in detail, we will proceed to a detailed study of the two most important solutions in this theory:

- the spherically symmetric static asymptotically flat vacuum solutions
- the general vacuum gravitational plane wave solution in this theory.

We will use the first to obtain the predictions of Nordström's theory for the four classic solar system tests of relativistic gravitation theories (in the ambient field of an isolated spherically symmetric object), and we will use the second to compare gravitational radiation in Nordström's theory and in Einstein's general theory of relativity.

== The static spherically symmetric asymptotically flat vacuum solution ==
The static vacuum solutions in Nordström's theory are the Lorentzian manifolds with metrics of the form

$$ds^2 = \exp(2 \psi) \, \eta_{ab} \, dx^a \, dx^b, \; \; \Delta \psi = 0$$

where we can take the flat spacetime Laplace operator on the right. To first order in $\psi$, the metric becomes

$$ds^2 = (1 + 2 \, \psi) \, \eta_{ab} \, dx^a \, dx^b$$

where $\eta_{ab} \, dx^a \, dx^b$ is the metric of Minkowski spacetime (the flat background).

=== The metric ===
Adopting polar spherical coordinates, and using the known spherically symmetric asymptotically vanishing solutions of the Laplace equation, we can write the desired exact solution as

$$ds^2 = (1-m/\rho) \, \left( -dt^2 + d\rho^2 + \rho^2 \, ( d\theta^2 + \sin(\theta)^2 \, d\phi^2 ) \right)$$

where we justify our choice of integration constants by the fact that this is the unique choice giving the correct Newtonian limit. This gives the solution in terms of coordinates which directly exhibit the fact that this spacetime is conformally equivalent to Minkowski spacetime, but the radial coordinate in this chart does not readily admit a direct geometric interpretation. Therefore, we adopt instead Schwarzschild coordinates, using the transformation $r = \rho \, (1 - m/\rho)$, which brings the metric into the form

$$ds^2 = (1+m/r)^{-2} \, (-dt^2 + dr^2) + r^2 \, (d\theta^2 + \sin(\theta)^2 \, d\phi^2 )$$
$$-\infty < t < \infty, \; 0 < r < \infty, \; 0 < \theta < \pi, \; -\pi < \phi < \pi$$

Here, $r$ now has the simple geometric interpretation that the surface area of the coordinate sphere $r = r_0$ is just $4 \pi \, r_0^2$.

Just as happens in the corresponding static spherically symmetric asymptotically flat solution of general relativity, this solution admits a four-dimensional Lie group of isometries, or equivalently, a four-dimensional (real) Lie algebra of Killing vector fields. These are readily determined to be

$\partial_t$ (translation in time)
$\partial_\phi$ (rotation about an axis through the origin)
$$-\cos(\phi) \, \partial_\theta + \cot(\theta) \, \sin(\phi) \, \partial_\phi$$
$$\sin(\phi) \, \partial_\theta + \cot(\theta) \, \cos(\phi) \, \partial_\phi$$

These are exactly the same vector fields which arise in the Schwarzschild coordinate chart for the Schwarzschild vacuum solution of general relativity, and they simply express the fact that this spacetime is static and spherically symmetric.

=== Geodesics ===
The geodesic equations are readily obtained from the geodesic Lagrangian. As always, these are second order nonlinear ordinary differential equations.

If we set $\theta=\pi/2$ we find that test particle motion confined to the equatorial plane is possible, and in this case first integrals (first order ordinary differential equations) are readily obtained. First, we have

$$\dot{t} = E \, \left( 1 + m/r \right)^2 \approx E \, \left( 1 + 2 m/r \right)$$

where to first order in m we have the same result as for the Schwarzschild vacuum. This also shows that Nordström's theory agrees with the result of the Pound–Rebka experiment. Second, we have

$$\dot{\phi} = L/r^2$$

which is the same result as for the Schwarzschild vacuum. This expresses conservation of orbital angular momentum of test particles moving in the equatorial plane, and shows that the period of a nearly circular orbit (as observed by a distant observer) will be same as for the Schwarzschild vacuum. Third, with $\epsilon = -1,0,1$ for timelike, null, spacelike geodesics, we find

$$\frac{\dot{r}^2}{ \left( 1+m/r \right)^4} = E^2 - V$$

where

$$V = \frac{L^2/r^2 - \epsilon}{ \left( 1 + m/r \right)^2}$$

is a kind of effective potential. In the timelike case, we see from this that there exist stable circular orbits at $r_c = L^2/m$, which agrees perfectly with Newtonian theory (if we ignore the fact that now the angular but not the radial distance interpretation of r agrees with flat space notions). In contrast, in the Schwarzschild vacuum we have to first order in m the expression $r_c \approx L^2/m - 3 m$. In a sense, the extra term here results from the nonlinearity of the vacuum Einstein field equation.

=== Static observers ===
It makes sense to ask how much force is required to hold a test particle with a given mass over the massive object which we assume is the source of this static spherically symmetric gravitational field. To find out, we need only adopt the simple frame field

$$\vec{e}_0 = \left( 1 + m/r \right) \, \partial_t$$
$$\vec{e}_1 = \left( 1 + m/r \right) \, \partial_r$$
$$\vec{e}_2 = \frac{1}{r} \, \partial_\theta$$
$$\vec{e}_3 = \frac{1}{r \, \sin(\theta)} \, \partial_\phi$$

Then, the acceleration of the world line of our test particle is simply

$$\nabla_{\vec{e}_0} \vec{e}_0 = \frac{m}{r^2} \, \vec{e}_1$$

Thus, the particle must maintain radially outward to maintain its position, with a magnitude given by the familiar Newtonian expression (but again we must bear in mind that the radial coordinate here cannot quite be identified with a flat space radial coordinate). Put in other words, this is the "gravitational acceleration" measured by a static observer who uses a rocket engine to maintain his position. In contrast, to second order in m, in the Schwarzschild vacuum the magnitude of the radially outward acceleration of a static observer is m r^{−2} + m^2 r^{−3}; here too, the second term expresses the fact that Einstein gravity is slightly stronger "at corresponding points" than Nordström gravity.

The tidal tensor measured by a static observer is

$$E[\vec{X}]_{ab} = \frac{m}{r^3} \, {\rm diag}(-2,1,1) + \frac{m^2}{r^4} \, {\rm diag}(-1,1,1)$$

where we take $\vec{X}=\vec{e}_0$. The first term agrees with the corresponding solution in the Newtonian theory of gravitation and the one in general relativity. The second term shows that the tidal forces are a bit stronger in Nordström gravity than in Einstein gravity.

=== Extra-Newtonian precession of periastria ===
In our discussion of the geodesic equations, we showed that in the equatorial coordinate plane $\theta=\pi/2$ we have

$$\dot{r}^2 = (E^2 - V) \; ( 1 + m/r )^4$$

where $V = (1+L^2/r^2)/(1+m/r)^2$ for a timelike geodesic. Differentiating with respect to proper time s, we obtain

$$2 \dot{r} \ddot{r} = \frac{d}{dr} \left( (E^2-V) \, (1+m/r)^4 \right) \; \dot{r}$$

Dividing both sides by $\dot{r}$ gives

$$\ddot{r} = \frac{1}{2} \, \frac{d}{dr} \left( (E^2-V) \, (1+m/r)^4 \right)$$

We found earlier that the minimum of V occurs at $r_c = L^2/m$ where $E_c = L^2/(L^2+m^2)$. Evaluating the derivative, using our earlier results, and setting $\varepsilon = r-L^2/m^2$, we find

$$\ddot{\varepsilon} = -\frac{m^4}{L^8} \, (m^2+L^2) \, \varepsilon + O(\varepsilon^2)$$

which is (to first order) the equation of simple harmonic motion.

In other words, nearly circular orbits will exhibit a radial oscillation. However, unlike what happens in Newtonian gravitation, the period of this oscillation will not quite match the orbital period. This will result in slow precession of the periastria (points of closest approach) of our nearly circular orbit, or more vividly, in a slow rotation of the long axis of a quasi-Keplerian nearly elliptical orbit. Specifically,

$$\omega_{\rm shm} \approx \frac{m^2}{L^4} \, \sqrt{m^2+L^2} = \frac{1}{r^2} \, \sqrt{m^2+m r}$$

(where we used $L = \sqrt{m r}$ and removed the subscript from $r_c$), whereas

$$\omega_{\rm orb} = \frac{L}{r^2} = \sqrt{m/r^3}$$

The discrepancy is

$$\Delta \omega = \omega_{\rm orb} - \omega_{\rm shm} = \sqrt{\frac{m}{r^3}} - \sqrt{\frac{m^2}{r^4} + \frac{m}{r^3}} \approx -\frac{1}{2} \sqrt{ \frac{m^3}{r^5}}$$

so the periastrion lag per orbit is

$$\Delta \phi = 2 \pi \, \Delta \omega \approx -\pi \, \sqrt{\frac{m^3}{r^5}}$$

and to first order in m, the long axis of the nearly elliptical orbit rotates with the rate

$$\frac{ \Delta \phi}{\omega_{\rm orb}} \approx -\frac{\pi m}{r}$$

This can be compared with the corresponding expression for the Schwarzschild vacuum solution in general relativity, which is (to first order in m)

$$\frac{ \Delta \phi}{\omega_{\rm orb}} \approx \frac{6 \pi m}{r}$$

Thus, in Nordström's theory, if the nearly elliptical orbit is transversed counterclockwise, the long axis slowly rotates clockwise, whereas in general relativity, it rotates counterclockwise six times faster. In the first case we may speak of a periastrion lag and in the second case, a periastrion advance. In either theory, with more work, we can derive more general expressions, but we shall be satisfied here with treating the special case of nearly circular orbits.

For example, according to Nordström's theory, the perihelia of Mercury should lag at a rate of about 7 seconds of arc per century, whereas according to general relativity, the perihelia should advance at a rate of about 43 seconds of arc per century.

=== Light delay ===
Null geodesics in the equatorial plane of our solution satisfy

$$0 = \frac{-dt^2 + dr^2}{(1 + m/r)^2} + r^2 \, d\phi^2$$

Consider two events on a null geodesic, before and after its point of closest approach to the origin. Let these distances be $R_1, \, R, \, R_2$ with $R_1, \, R_2 \gg R$. We wish to eliminate $\phi$, so put $R = r \, \cos \phi$ (the equation of a straight line in polar coordinates) and differentiate to obtain

$$0 = -r \sin \phi \, d\phi + \cos \phi \, dr$$

Thus

$$r^2 \, d\phi^2 = \cot(\phi)^2 \, dr^2 = \frac{R^2}{r^2-R^2} \, dr^2$$

Plugging this into the line element and solving for dt, we obtain

$$dt \approx \frac{1}{\sqrt{r^2-R^2}} \; \left( r + m \, \frac{R^2}{r^2}  \right) \; dr$$

Thus the coordinate time from the first event to the event of closest approach is

$$(\Delta t)_1 = \int_R^{R_1} dt \approx \frac{m+R_1}{R_1} \, \sqrt{R_1^2-R^2} = \sqrt{R_1^2-R^2} + m \, \sqrt{1-(R/R_1)^2}$$

and likewise

$$(\Delta t)_2 = \int_R^{R_2} dt \approx \frac{m+R_2}{R_2} \, \sqrt{R_2^2-R^2} = \sqrt{R_2^2-R^2} + m \, \sqrt{1-(R/R_2)^2}$$

Here the elapsed coordinate time expected from Newtonian theory is of course

$$\sqrt{R_1^2-R^2} + \sqrt{R_2^2-R^2}$$

so the relativistic time delay, according to Nordström's theory, is

$$\Delta t = m \, \left(  \sqrt{1-(R/R_1)^2} + \sqrt{1-(R/R_2)^2} \right)$$

To first order in the small ratios $R/R_1, \; R/R_2$ this is just $\Delta t = 2 m$.

The corresponding result in general relativity is

$$\Delta t = 2 m + 2 m \, \log \left( \frac{4 \, R_1 \, R_2}{R^2} \right)$$

which depends logarithmically on the small ratios $R/R_1, \; R/R_2$. For example, in the classic experiment in which, at a time when, as viewed from Earth, Venus is just about to pass behind the Sun, a radar signal emitted from Earth which grazes the limb of the Sun, bounces off Venus, and returns to Earth (once again grazing the limb of the Sun), the relativistic time delay is about 20 microseconds according to Nordström's theory and about 240 microseconds according to general relativity.

== Results ==
We can summarize the results we found above in the following table, in which the given expressions represent appropriate approximations:

Comparison of Predictions in Three Theories of Gravitation
	Newton	Nordström	Einstein
Acceleration of static test particle	m r^{−2}	m r^{−2}	m r^{−2} + m^{2} r^{−3}
Extra-Coulomb tidal force	0	m^{2} r^{−4} diag(-1,1,1)	0
Radius of circular orbit	R = L^{2} m ^{−1}	R = L^{2} m ^{−1}	R = L^{2} m^{−1} − 3 m
Gravitational red shift factor	1	1 + m r ^{−1}	1 + m r ^{−1}
Angle of light bending	$\delta \phi = \frac{2 \, m}{R}$	0	$\delta \phi = \frac{4 \, m}{R}$
Rate of precession of periastria	0	$\frac{\Delta \phi}{\omega_{\rm orb}} = -\frac{\pi \, m}{R}$	$\frac{\Delta \phi}{\omega_{\rm orb}} = \frac{6 \, \pi \, m}{R}$
Time delay	0	$2 \, m$	$2 \, m + 2 \, m \; \log \left( \frac{4 \, R_1 \, R_2}{R^2} \right)$

The last four lines in this table list the so-called four classic solar system tests of relativistic theories of gravitation. Of the three theories appearing in the table, only general relativity is in agreement with the results of experiments and observations in the Solar System. Nordström's theory gives the correct result only for the Pound–Rebka experiment; not surprisingly, Newton's theory flunks all four relativistic tests.

== Vacuum gravitational plane wave ==
In the double null chart for Minkowski spacetime,

$$ds^2 =- 2 \, du \, dv + dx^2 + dy^2, \; \; \; -\infty < u, \, v, \, x, \, y < \infty$$

a simple solution of the wave equation

$$- 2 \, \psi_{uv} + \psi_{xx} + \psi_{yy} = 0$$

is $\psi = f(u)$, where f is an arbitrary smooth function. This represents a plane wave traveling in the z direction. Therefore, Nordström's theory admits the exact vacuum solution

$$ds^2 = \exp(2 f(u)) \; \left(- 2 \, du \, dv + dx^2 + dy^2 \right), \; \; \; -\infty < u, \, v, \, x, \, y < \infty$$

which we can interpret in terms of the propagation of a gravitational plane wave.

This Lorentzian manifold admits a six-dimensional Lie group of isometries, or equivalently, a six-dimensional Lie algebra of Killing vector fields:

$\partial_v$ (a null translation, "opposing" the wave vector field $\partial_u$)
$\partial_x, \; \; \partial_y$ (spatial translation orthogonal to the wavefronts)
$-y \, \partial_x + x \, \partial_y$ (rotation about axis parallel to direction of propagation)
$$x \, \partial_v + u \, \partial_x, \; \; y \, \partial_v + u \, \partial_y$$

For example, the Killing vector field $x \, \partial_v + u \, \partial_x$ integrates to give the one parameter family of isometries

$$(u,v,x,y) \longrightarrow (u, \; v+ x \, \lambda + \frac{u}{2} \, \lambda^2, \; x + u \, \lambda, \; y)$$

Just as in special relativity (and general relativity), it is always possible to change coordinates, without disturbing the form of the solution, so that the wave propagates in any direction transverse to $\partial_z$. Note that our isometry group is transitive on the hypersurfaces $u=u_0$.

In contrast, the generic gravitational plane wave in general relativity has only a five-dimensional Lie group of isometries. (In both theories, special plane waves may have extra symmetries.) We'll say a bit more about why this is so in a moment.

Adopting the frame field

$$\vec{e}_0 = \frac{1}{\sqrt{2}} \, \left( \partial_v + \exp(-2f) \, \partial_u \right)$$
$$\vec{e}_1 = \frac{1}{\sqrt{2}} \, \left( \partial_v - \exp(-2f) \, \partial_u \right)$$
$$\vec{e}_2 = \partial_x$$
$$\vec{e}_3 = \partial_y$$

we find that the corresponding family of test particles are inertial (freely falling), since the acceleration vector vanishes

$$\nabla_{\vec{e}_0} \vec{e}_0 = 0$$

Notice that if f vanishes, this family becomes a family of mutually stationary test particles in flat (Minkowski) spacetime. With respect to the timelike geodesic congruence of world lines obtained by integrating the timelike unit vector field $\vec{X} = \vec{e}_0$, the expansion tensor

$$\theta[\vec{X}]_{\hat{p} \hat{q}} = \frac{1}{\sqrt{2}} \, f'(u) \, \exp (-2 \, f(u)) \, {\rm diag} (0,1,1)$$

shows that our test particles are expanding or contracting isotropically and transversely to the direction of propagation. This is exactly what we would expect for a transverse spin-0 wave; the behavior of analogous families of test particles which encounter a gravitational plane wave in general relativity is quite different, because these are spin-2 waves. This is due to the fact that Nordström's theory of gravitation is a scalar theory, whereas Einstein's theory of gravitation (general relativity) is a tensor theory. On the other hand, gravitational waves in both theories are transverse waves. Electromagnetic plane waves are of course also transverse. The tidal tensor

$$E[\vec{X}]_{\hat{p}\hat{q}} = \frac{1}{2} \, \exp (-4 \, f(u)) \; \left ( f'(u) ^2 - f''(u) \right) \, {\rm diag} (0,1,1)$$

further exhibits the spin-0 character of the gravitational plane wave in Nordström's theory. (The tidal tensor and expansion tensor are three-dimensional tensors which "live" in the hyperplane elements orthogonal to $\vec{e}_0$, which in this case happens to be irrotational, so we can regard these tensors as defined on orthogonal hyperslices.)

The exact solution we are discussing here, which we interpret as a propagating gravitational plane wave, gives some basic insight into the propagation of gravitational radiation in Nordström's theory, but it does not yield any insight into the generation of gravitational radiation in this theory. At this point, it would be natural to discuss the analog for Nordström's theory of gravitation of the standard linearized gravitational wave theory in general relativity, but we shall not pursue this.

== See also ==
- Alternatives to general relativity
- Congruence (general relativity)
- Gunnar Nordström
- Obsolete physical theories
- General relativity
