= Gunnar Nordström =

Finnish physicist (1881–1923)

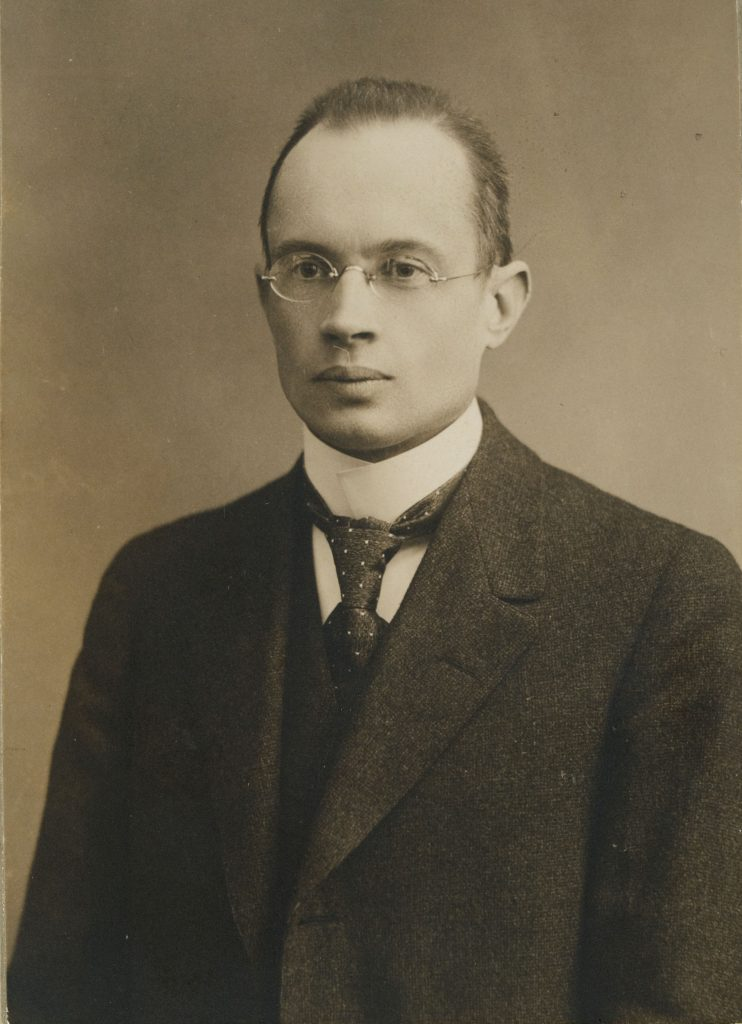
- Nordström at the age of 35
- Born: 12 March 1881; Helsinki, Finland
- Died: 24 December 1923 (aged 42); Helsinki, Finland
- Citizenship: Russian, Finnish
- Education: Helsinki University of Technology (Engineer), University of Helsinki (Master of Science, and PhD)
- Known for: Nordström's theory of gravitation Kaluza–Klein theory Reissner–Nordström metric
- Scientific career
- Fields: Physics, Mechanics
- Workplaces: Helsinki University of Technology; University of Helsinki; University of Göttingen; University of Leiden
- Academic advisors: Paul Ehrenfest, Walther Nernst (briefly)

Gunnar Nordström (12 March 1881 – 24 December 1923) was a Finnish theoretical physicist best remembered for his theory of gravitation, which was an early competitor of general relativity. Nordström is often designated by modern writers as The Einstein of Finland due to his novel work in similar fields with similar methods to Einstein.

== Education and career ==
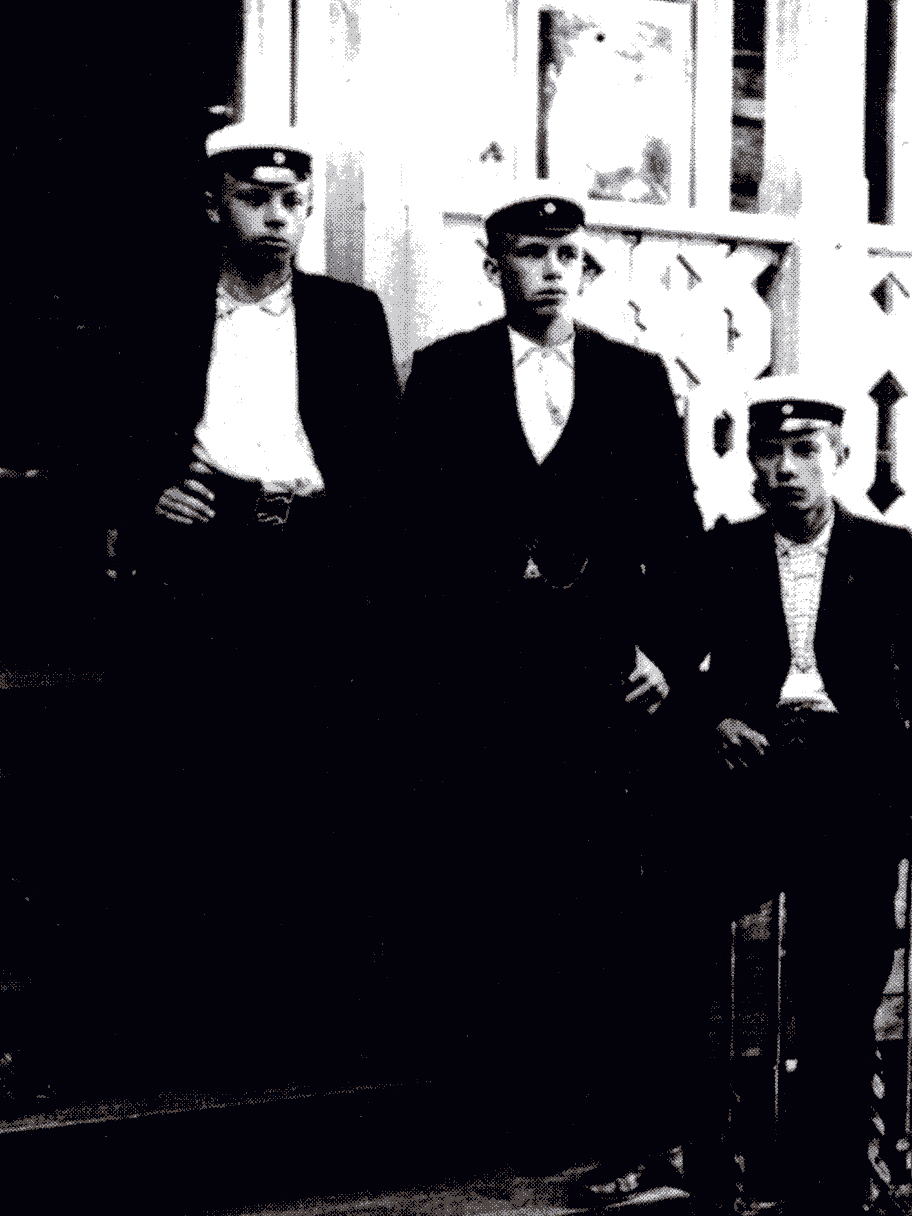
Picture taken in 1900 of three high school graduates; Gunnar Nordström is on the left.

Nordström graduated high-school from Brobergska skolan in central Helsinki 1899. At first he went on to study mechanical engineering, graduating in 1903 from the Polytechnic institute in Helsinki, later renamed Helsinki University of Technology and today a part of the Aalto University. During his studies he developed an interest for more theoretical subjects, proceeding after graduation to further study for a master's degree in natural science, mathematics and economy at the University of Helsinki (1903–1907).

Nordström then moved to Göttingen, Germany, where he had been recommended to go to study physical chemistry. However, he soon lost interest in the intended field and moved to study electrodynamics, a field the University of Göttingen was renowned for at the time. He returned to Finland to complete his doctoral dissertation at the University of Helsinki in 1910, and become a docent at the university. Subsequently, he became fascinated with the very novel and soon burgeoning field of gravitation and wanted to move to the Netherlands where scientists with contributions to that fields such as Hendrik Lorentz, Paul Ehrenfest and Willem de Sitter were active. Nordström was able to move to Leiden in 1916 to work under Ehrenfest, in the midst of the First World War, due to his Russian passport. Nordström spent considerable time in Leiden where he met a Dutch physics student, Cornelia van Leeuwen, with whom he went on to have several children. After the war he declined a professorship at the University of Berlin, a post awarded instead to Max Born, in order to return to Finland in 1918 and hold at first the professorship of physics and later the professorship of mechanics at the Helsinki University of Technology. In 1922 he was elected member of The Finnish Society of Sciences and Letters.

One of the keys to Nordström's success as a scientist was his ability to learn to apply differential geometry to physics, a new approach that also would eventually lead Albert Einstein to the theory of general relativity. Few other scientists of the time in the world were able to make effective use of this new analytical tool, with the notable exception of Ernst Lindelöf.

== Contributions to theory ==
During his time in Leiden, Nordström solved Einstein's field equations outside a spherically symmetric charged body. The solution was also found by Hans Reissner, Hermann Weyl and George Barker Jeffery, and it is nowadays known as the Reissner–Nordström metric. Nordström maintained frequent contact with many of the other great physicists of the era, including Niels Bohr and Albert Einstein. For example, it was Bohr's contributions that helped Nordström to circumvent the Russian censorship of German post to Finland, which at the time was a grand duchy in personal union with the Russian Empire.

The theory for which Nordström was arguably most famous in his own lifetime, his theory of gravitation, was for a long time considered as a competitor to Einstein's theory of general relativity, which was published in 1915, after Nordström's theory. In 1914 Nordström introduced an additional space dimension to his theory, which provided coupling to electromagnetism. This was the first of the extra dimensional theories, which later came to be known as Kaluza–Klein theory. Kaluza and Klein, whose names are commonly used today for the theory, did not publish their work until the 1920s. Some speculations as to why Nordström's contribution fell into obscurity are that his theory was partly published in Swedish and that Einstein in a later publication referenced to Kaluza alone. Today extra dimensions and theories thereof are widely researched, debated and even looked for experimentally.

Nordström's theory of gravitation was subsequently experimentally found to be inferior to Einstein's, as it did not predict the bending of light which was observed during the solar eclipse in 1919. However, Nordström and Einstein were in friendly competition or by some measure even cooperating scientists, not rivals. This can be seen from Nordström's public admiration of Einstein's work, as demonstrated by the two occasions on which Nordström nominated Einstein for the Nobel Prize in physics for his theory of relativity. Einstein never received the Nobel prize for the theory, as the first experimental evidence presented in 1919 could at the time still be disputed and there was not yet a consensus or even general understanding in the scientific community of the complex mathematical models that Einstein, Nordström and others had developed. Nordström's scalar theory is today mainly used as a pedagogical tool when learning general relativity.

Today, there is limited public knowledge of Nordström's contributions to science, even in Finland. However, after his death a number of Finnish physicists and mathematicians devoted their time to the theory of relativity and differential geometry, presumably due to the legacy he left. On the other hand, the most notable opponent of general relativity in the Finnish scientific world was Hjalmar Mellin, the previous rector of the Helsinki University of Technology where Nordström held professorship.

Gunnar Nordström's letter of recommendation to the Nobel Committee for Albert Einstein

== Personal life ==
At the outbreak of WWI, Nordström moved to the Netherlands, where he met and married his wife Cornelia van Leeuwen. They moved back to Finland in 1918.

== Death ==
Nordström died in December 1923, at the age of 42, from pernicious anemia. The illness was perhaps caused by exposure to radioactive substances. Nordström was known for experimenting with radioactive substances and for enjoying the Finnish sauna tradition using water from a spring rich in radium. Among his publications there is one from 1913 regarding the measurement of the radioactive emancipation power of different springs and ground waters in Finland.

== Selected publications ==
During Nordström's career he published 34 articles and research papers in languages including German, Dutch, Finnish, and his mother-tongue Swedish. Nordström is probably the first person to write about the theory of relativity in the languages of Finland.

- Die Energiegleichung für das elektromagnetische Feld bewegter Körper, 1908, Doctoral dissertation
- Rum och tid enligt Einstein och Minkowski, 1909, published in a series of the Finnish Society of Sciences and Letters: Öfversigt af Finska Vetenskaps-Societetens Förhandlingar
- Relativitätsprinzip und Gravitation, 1912, in Physikalische Zeitschrift
- Träge und Schwere Masse in der Relativitätsmechanik, 1913, in Annalen der Physik
- Über die Möglichkeit, das Elektromagnetische Feld und das Gravitationsfeld zu vereiningen, 1914, in Physikalische Zeitschrift
- Zur Elektrizitäts- und Gravitationstheorie, 1914, in the series Öfversigt
- Über eine mögliche Grundlage einer Theorie der Materie, 1915, in the series Öfversigt
- Een en ander over de energie van het zwaarte krachtsveld volgens de theorie van Einstein, 1918

== See also ==
- Nordström's theory of gravitation
