= Timeline of classical mechanics =

The following is a timeline of the history of classical mechanics:

== Antiquity ==
- 4th century BC – Aristotle invents the system of Aristotelian physics, which is later largely disproved
- 4th century BC – Babylonian astronomers calculate Jupiter's position using the Trapezoidal rule
- 260 BC – Archimedes works out the principle of the lever and connects buoyancy to weight
- 60 – Hero of Alexandria writes Metrica, Mechanics (on means to lift heavy objects), and Pneumatics (on machines working on pressure)
- 350 – Themistius states, that static friction is larger than kinetic friction

== Early mechanics ==
- 6th century – John Philoponus introduces the concept of impetus and the theory was modified by Avicenna in the 11th century and Ibn Malka al-Baghdadi in the 12th century
- 6th century – John Philoponus says that by observation, two balls of very different weights will fall at nearly the same speed. He therefore tests the equivalence principle
- 1021 – Al-Biruni uses three orthogonal coordinates to describe point in space
- 1100–1138 – Avempace develops the concept of a fatigue, which according to Shlomo Pines is precursor to Leibnizian idea of force
- 1100–1165 – Hibat Allah Abu'l-Barakat al-Baghdaadi discovers that force is proportional to acceleration rather than speed, a fundamental law in classical mechanics
- 1340–1358 – Jean Buridan develops the theory of impetus
- 14th century – Oxford Calculators and French collaborators prove the mean speed theorem
- 14th century – Nicole Oresme derives the times-squared law for uniformly accelerated change. Oresme, however, regarded this discovery as a purely intellectual exercise having no relevance to the description of any natural phenomena, and consequently failed to recognise any connection with the motion of accelerating bodies
- 1500–1528 – Al-Birjandi develops the theory of "circular inertia" to explain Earth's rotation
- 16th century – Francesco Beato and Luca Ghini experimentally contradict Aristotelian view on free fall.
- 16th century – Domingo de Soto suggests that bodies falling through a homogeneous medium are uniformly accelerated. Soto, however, did not anticipate many of the qualifications and refinements contained in Galileo's theory of falling bodies. He did not, for instance, recognise, as Galileo did, that a body would fall with a strictly uniform acceleration only in a vacuum, and that it would otherwise eventually reach a uniform terminal velocity
- 1581 – Galileo Galilei notices the timekeeping property of the pendulum
- 1589 – Galileo Galilei uses balls rolling on inclined planes to show that different weights fall with the same acceleration
- 1638 – Galileo Galilei publishes Dialogues Concerning Two New Sciences (which were materials science and kinematics) where he develops, amongst other things, Galilean transformation
- 1644 – René Descartes suggests an early form of the law of conservation of momentum
- 1645 – Ismaël Bullialdus argues that "gravity" weakens as the inverse square of the distance
- 1651 – Giovanni Battista Riccioli and Francesco Maria Grimaldi discover the Coriolis effect
- 1658 – Christiaan Huygens experimentally discovers that balls placed anywhere inside an inverted cycloid reach the lowest point of the cycloid in the same time and thereby experimentally shows that the cycloid is the tautochrone
- 1668 – John Wallis suggests the law of conservation of momentum
- 1673 – Christiaan Huygens publishes his Horologium Oscillatorium. Huygens describes in this work the first two laws of motion. The book is also the first modern treatise in which a physical problem (the accelerated motion of a falling body) is idealized by a set of parameters and then analyzed mathematically.
- 1676–1689 – Gottfried Leibniz develops the concept of vis viva, a limited theory of conservation of energy
- 1677 – Baruch Spinoza puts forward a primitive notion of Newton's first law

== Newtonian mechanics ==
- 1687 – Isaac Newton publishes his Philosophiæ Naturalis Principia Mathematica, in which he formulates Newton's laws of motion and Newton's law of universal gravitation
- 1690 – James Bernoulli shows that the cycloid is the solution to the tautochrone problem
- 1691 – Johann Bernoulli shows that a chain freely suspended from two points will form a catenary
- 1691 – James Bernoulli shows that the catenary curve has the lowest center of gravity of any chain hung from two fixed points
- 1696 – Johann Bernoulli shows that the cycloid is the solution to the brachistochrone problem
- 1710 – Jakob Hermann shows that Laplace–Runge–Lenz vector is conserved for a case of the inverse-square central force
- 1714 – Brook Taylor derives the fundamental frequency of a stretched vibrating string in terms of its tension and mass per unit length by solving an ordinary differential equation
- 1733 – Daniel Bernoulli derives the fundamental frequency and harmonics of a hanging chain by solving an ordinary differential equation
- 1734 – Daniel Bernoulli solves the ordinary differential equation for the vibrations of an elastic bar clamped at one end
- 1739 – Leonhard Euler solves the ordinary differential equation for a forced harmonic oscillator and notices the resonance
- 1742 – Colin Maclaurin discovers his uniformly rotating self-gravitating spheroids
- 1743 – Jean le Rond d'Alembert publishes his Traite de Dynamique, in which he introduces the concept of generalized forces and D'Alembert's principle
- 1747 – D'Alembert and Alexis Clairaut publish first approximate solutions to the three-body problem
- 1749 – Leonhard Euler derives equation for Coriolis acceleration
- 1759 – Leonhard Euler solves the partial differential equation for the vibration of a rectangular drum
- 1764 – Leonhard Euler examines the partial differential equation for the vibration of a circular drum and finds one of the Bessel function solutions
- 1776 – John Smeaton publishes a paper on experiments relating power, work, momentum and kinetic energy, and supporting the conservation of energy

== Analytical mechanics ==
- 1788 – Joseph-Louis Lagrange presents Lagrange's equations of motion in the Méchanique Analytique
- 1798 – Pierre-Simon Laplace publishes his Traité de mécanique céleste vol.1 and lasts vol.5 in 1825. In this, he summarized and extended the work of his predecessors
- 1803 – Louis Poinsot develops idea of angular momentum conservation (this result was previously known only in the case of conservation of areal velocity)
- 1813 – Peter Ewart supports the idea of the conservation of energy in his paper "On the measure of moving force"
- 1821 – William Hamilton begins his analysis of Hamilton's characteristic function and Hamilton–Jacobi equation
- 1829 – Carl Friedrich Gauss introduces Gauss's principle of least constraint
- 1834 – Carl Jacobi discovers his uniformly rotating self-gravitating ellipsoids
- 1834 – Louis Poinsot notes an instance of the intermediate axis theorem
- 1835 – William Hamilton states Hamilton's canonical equations of motion
- 1838 – Liouville begins work on Liouville's theorem
- 1841 – Julius von Mayer, an amateur scientist, writes a paper on the conservation of energy but his lack of academic training leads to a priority dispute.
- 1847 – Hermann von Helmholtz formally states the law of conservation of energy
- first half of the 19th century – Cauchy develops his momentum equation and his stress tensor
- 1851 – Léon Foucault shows the Earth's rotation with a huge pendulum (Foucault pendulum)
- 1870 – Rudolf Clausius deduces virial theorem
- 1876 – Robert Stawell Ball mathematically formalizes screw theory for rigid body dynamics.
- 1890 – Henri Poincaré discovers the sensibility of initial conditions in the three-body problem.
- 1898 – Jacques Hadamard discusses the Hadamard billiards.

== Modern developments ==
- 1900 – Max Planck introduces the idea of quanta, introducing quantum mechanics
- 1902 – James Jeans finds the length scale required for gravitational perturbations to grow in a static nearly homogeneous medium
- 1905 – Albert Einstein first mathematically describes Brownian motion and introduces relativistic mechanics
- 1915 – Emmy Noether proves Noether's theorem, from which conservation laws are deduced
- 1915 – Albert Einstein introduces general relativity
- 1923 – Élie Cartan introduces the geometrized Newtonian gravitation, treating Newtonian gravitation in terms of spacetime.
- 1931–1932 – Bernard Koopman and John von Neumann papers led to the development of Koopman–von Neumann classical mechanics.
- 1952 – Parker develops a tensor form of the virial theorem
- 1954 – Andrey Kolmogorov publishes the first version of the Kolmogorov–Arnold–Moser theorem.
- 1961 – Edward Norton Lorenz discovers Lorenz systems and establishes the field of chaos theory.
- 1963 - Douglas G. Currie, Thomas F. Jordan and E. C. George Sudarshan prove the no-interaction theorem in special relativity.
- 1978 – Vladimir Arnold states precise form of Liouville–Arnold theorem
- 1983 – Mordehai Milgrom proposes modified Newtonian dynamics as an alternative to the dark matter hypothesis
- 1988 – Jeff Xia shows that non-collisional singularities exist in classical gravity according to Painlevé conjecture.
- 1992 – Udwadia and Kalaba create Udwadia–Kalaba equation
- 2003 – John D. Norton introduces Norton's dome
