= History of classical field theory =

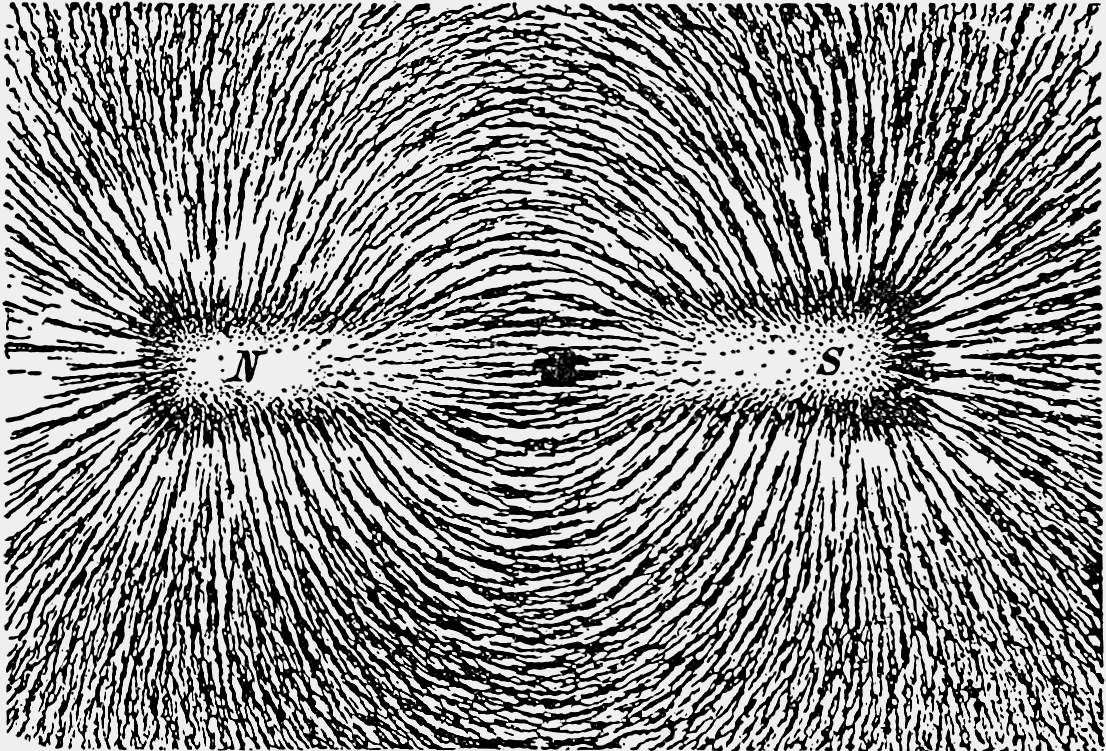
Iron filings used to show the magnetic field lines of a bar magnet.

In the history of physics, the concept of fields had its origins in the 18th century in a mathematical formulation of Newton's law of universal gravitation, but it was seen as deficient as it implied action at a distance. In 1852, Michael Faraday treated the magnetic field as a physical object, reasoning about lines of force. James Clerk Maxwell used Faraday's conceptualisation to help formulate his unification of electricity and magnetism in his field theory of electromagnetism.

With Albert Einstein's special relativity and the Michelson–Morley experiment, it became clear that electromagnetic waves could travel in a vacuum without the need of a medium or luminiferous aether. Einstein also developed general relativity, in which spacetime was treated as a field and its curvature was the origin of the gravitational interactions, putting an end to action at a distance.

In quantum field theory, fields become the fundamental objects of study, and particles are excitations of these fields. To differentiate from quantum field theory, previously developed field theories were called classical field theories.

== Early mechanical explanations of forces ==
=== Magnetism ===
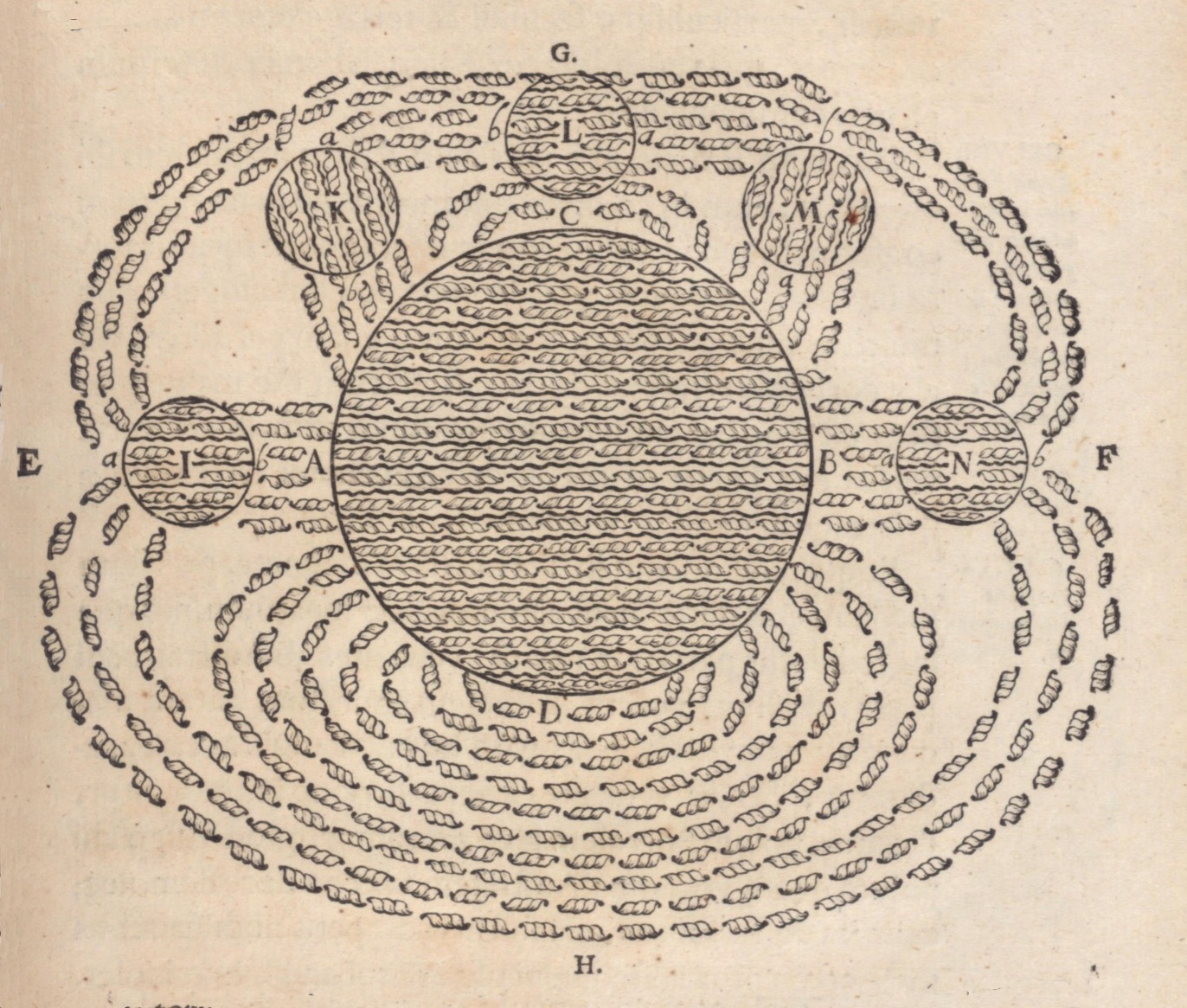
René Descartes drawing of a magnetic effluvia from 1644. It shows the magnetic effluvia of the Earth (D) attracting several round lodestones (I, K, L, M, N) and illustrates his theory of magnetism.

The first record of explanations of how magnets works comes from ancient Greece. Thinkers like Thales of Miletus, Aristotle and Diogenes Laertius considered that magnets were animated and should have a soul in order to move. Empedocles tried to provide a mechanical explanation of why magnets could influence each other by introducing the concept of "effluences" emanated by magnets. According to book Quaestiones by Alexander of Aphrodisias from about 200 AD, this was Empedocles view:

On the reason why the lodestone attracts iron. Empedocles says that the iron is attracted to the stone by the effluences which issue from both, and because the pores of the stone are commensurate with the effluences from the iron. The effluences from the stone stir and disperse the air lying upon and obstructing the pores of the iron and when this is removed the iron is drawn on by a concerted outflow. As the effluences from the iron travel towards the pores of the stone, because they are commensurate with them and fit into them the iron itself follows and moves together with them.

Democritus had a similar view as Empedocles but added that the effluences created a void. Metals and rocks could also contain void in order to be less or more attracted to magnets.

This idea survived up to the Scientific Revolution. In 1664, René Descartes produced his theory of magnetism, in which the flow of effluences or effluvia rarified the air, creating differences in air pressure. According to Descartes, these effluvia circulated inside and around the magnet in closed loops.

=== Gravitation ===
In ancient times, Greek thinkers like Posidonius (1 BC) noticed a relation between the tides and the position of the Moon in the sky. He considered that light from the Moon had an influence on the tides.

In the 9th century, Abu Ma'shar al-Balkhi (Latinized as Albumasar) wrote his book on The Great Introduction to the Science of Astrology (Kitāb al-madkhal al-kabīr) recorded the correlation between the tides and the Moon, noticing that there were two tides in a day. As there is no moonlight when the Moon is the opposite side of Earth, he proposed that the Moon had some intrinsic virtue that attracted the water. The Sun would have some of that virtue but less than the moon. This book was translated to Latin and was a reference for European medieval scholars. One writer that rejected this astrological reading was Robert Grosseteste who wrote On the Ebb and Flow of the Sea (Latin: Questio de fluxu et refluxu maris), written around 1227, in which he insisted that light from the Moon rarefied the air producing the tides. He explained the tides when the Moon is below the horizon as reflections from the celestial sphere. Two theories coexisted, the idea of light influencing the tides and Albumasar' virtue. Roger Bacon supported the idea of Grosseteste, Albertus Magnus supported a mix of both, and others like Jean Buridan hesitated between the two.

In 17th century, Johannes Kepler who came up with the Kepler's laws of planetary motion, proposed the idea that the Sun emitted some sort of invisible "species" that traveled instantaneously and acted more strongly depending on the distance, size and density of the planet. Kepler considered that if the Sun rotated, it would create a whirlpool of species that drags all planets to orbit around it. The idea of the rotation of the Sun was confirmed by Galileo Galilei, but the frequency did not match Kepler's calculations. To explain the tides, Kepler considered that the species would behave similar to magnetic forces.

Descartes rejected Kepler's theory and also constructed also a mechanical explanation of gravitation based on the ideas vortices, considering space continuous. Descartes pushed the Aristotelian idea of the plenum, considering that there was no void and the entirety of space was filled with corpuscles.

== Newtonian gravitation ==
Field lines between Earth and the Moon. In Isaac Newton's classical gravitation, mass is the source of an attractive gravitational field.

=== Newtonian mechanics ===
Before Newton, only a few mechanical explanations of gravity existed.

In 1687, Newton's Principia in 1687 provided a framework with which to investigate the motion and forces. He introduced mathematical definition of gravitational force with his law of universal gravitation, in which the gravitational force between two bodies is directed along the line separating the bodies and its magnitude is proportional to the product of their masses, divided by the square of their distance apart.

While Newton explanation of gravity was very successful in astronomy, it did not explain how it could act at a distance and instantaneously. Newton, considered action at a distance to be:

so great an Absurdity that I believe no Man who has in philosophical Matters a competent Faculty of thinking can ever fall into it.

— Isaac Newton, Letters to Bentley, 1692/3

Gottfried Wilhelm Leibniz complained that Newtonian mechanics violated the metaphysics of continuity according to natura non facit saltus, in which every cause and effect should be connected to one another. Roger Joseph Boscovich rejected Leibniz take considering that bodies would have discontinuous changes in density at the boundaries and that if came into contact their velocities would change discontinuously.

British empiricist like John Locke, George Locke and David Hume regarded Newton's second law of motion as sufficient, as it establishes a causal relation between force and acceleration.

=== Beginning of aether theories ===
To solve the issue of action at a distance, aether theories were developed. The aether was considered as a yet undetected medium and responsible agent for conducting the force. In a letter to Robert Boyle in 1679 Newton proposed an "aethereal substance" to explain gravity. Later in his work Opticks of 1717 he considered the aether to be made of impenetrable corpuscules. Newtonian aether was very dilute and elastic. Immanuel Kant considered Newton's aether inconsistent as requiring additional forces between corpuscles. Leibniz on the other hand considered a continuous medium.

== Eulerian fluid dynamics ==
Velocity field lines around a ball in a fluid. The arrows indicate the velocity of the fluid.

An important development of field theories appeared with Leonhard Euler who expanded Newtonian mechanics in his work Mechanica of 1736. Euler work expanded on how to deal with rotations of rigid bodies, elasticity and fluid mechanics. To describe fluids he considered a flow velocity function (today called velocity field) defined at every point in space. However, this function was for a long time considered significantly different from that of the forces of gravitation as it was only defined inside a medium and thus was considered a real quantity. Modern science historian Mary Hesse attributed the origin of field theory to Euler flow velocity field.

Euler also introduced between 1755 and 1759 the Lagrangian and Eulerian specifications for the flow that would be important to detach motion of particles from field properties.

== Potential theory ==
Joseph-Louis Lagrange is often cited for introducing the concept of a potential in 1777, and independently by Adrien-Marie Legendre (1784–1794) and Pierre-Simon Laplace (1782–1799). Lagrange noticed that he could introduce a gravitational potential to derive the gravitational force. This function was called a potential function by mathematician George Green 1828 and by Carl Friedrich Gauss in 1840 just as "potential".

== Forces of electricity and magnetism ==
Charles-Augustin de Coulomb showed in 1785 that the repulsive force between two electrically charged spheres obeys the same (up to a sign) force law as Newton's law of universal gravitation. In 1823, Siméon Denis Poisson introduced the Poisson's equation, explaining the electric forces in terms of an electric potential. The same year André-Marie Ampère showed that the force between infinitesimal lengths of current-carrying wires similarly obeys an inverse-square law such that the force is directed along the line of separation between the wire elements. These law suffered from the same problem of action-at-a-distance.

=== Luminiferous aether ===
In 1800, Thomas Young proved the wave nature of light using the double-slit experiment. This discovery led him in 1802 to consider the existence of luminiferous aether in which light traveled. Augustin-Jean Fresnel considered it to be an elastic medium. The motion of this aether were described mathematically by scientist like Claude-Louis Navier (in 1821) and Augustin-Louis Cauchy (in 1828) as discrete medium. About 1840, George Stokes and Lord Kelvin extended the formalism to describe a continuous aether using the idea of a potential theory. This development was important as it allowed to describe any deformable medium in terms of continuous functions.

== Introduction of fields ==
=== Faraday's lines of force ===
Magnetic field lines of a magnetic dipole.

Michael Faraday developed the concept of lines of force to describe electric and magnetic phenomena. In 1831, he writes

By magnetic curves, I mean the lines of magnetic forces, however modified by the juxtaposition of poles, which would be depicted by iron filings; or those to which a very small magnetic needle would form a tangent."

He provided a definition in 1845,

But before I proceed to them, I will define the meaning I connect with certain terms which I shall have occasion to use: thus, by line of magnetic force, or magnetic line of force, or magnetic curve, I mean that exercise of magnetic force which is exerted in the lines usually called magnetic curves, and which equally exist as passing from or to magnetic poles, or forming concentric circles round an electric current. By line of electric force, I mean the force exerted in the lines joining two bodies, acting on each other according to the principles of static electric induction, which may also be either in curved or straight lines.

In his work, he also coined the term "magnetic field" in this sense in 1845, which he later used frequently. He provided a clear definition in 1850, stating

I will now endeavour to consider what the influence is which paramagnetic and diamagnetic bodies, viewed as conductors, exert upon the lines of force in a magnetic field. Any portion of space traversed by lines of magnetic power, may be taken as such a field, and there is probably no space without them. The condition of the field may vary in intensity of power. from place to place, either along the lines or across them; but it will be better to assume for the present consideration a field of equal force throughout, and I have formerly described how this may, for a certain limited space, be produced.

Faraday did not conceive of this field as a mere mathematical construct for calculating the forces between particles—having only rudimentary mathematical training, he had no use for abstracting reality to make quantitative predictions. Instead he conjectured that there was force filling the space where electromagnetic fields were generated and reasoned qualitatively about these forces with lines of force:

Important to the definition of these lines is that they represent a determinate and unchanging amount of force. Though, therefore, their forms, as they exist between two or more centers or sources of power, may vary greatly, and also the space through which they may be traced, yet the sum of power contained in any one section of a given portion of the lines is exactly equal to the sum of power in any other section of the same lines, however altered in form or however convergent or divergent they may be at the second place.

However, Faraday never used the term "electric field" explicitly. Nevertheless, Faraday's insights into the behavior of magnetic fields would prove invaluable for the development of electromagnetism and field theory.

=== Kelvin's definition ===
In 1845, Lord Kelvin formalized the mathematical similarities between the fields of electromagnetic phenomena and Joseph Fourier work on heat; and in 1847 between electric conduction and elasticity. These similarities led Lord Kelvin to propose a formal definition of magnetic field in 1851:

Any space at every point of which there is a finite magnetic force is called ‘a field of magnetic force’ or (magnetic being understood) simply ‘a field of force,’ or sometimes ‘a magnetic field’.

— Lord Kelvin, On the theory of magnetic induction in crystalline and non-crystalline substances,

Kelvin also introduced the concept of a magnetic vector potential.

=== Maxwell's electromagnetic field ===
Electric and magnetic fields of an electromagnetic wave along an axis. In vacuum these two fields are orthogonal and propagate at the speed of light as predicted by Maxwell.

In 1864, James Clerk Maxwell published "A Dynamical Theory of the Electromagnetic Field" in which he compiled all known equations of electricity and magnetism. Maxwell's equations led to an electromagnetic wave equation with waves that propagated in vacuum at the speed of light. He describes his research as

(3) The theory I propose may therefore be called a theory of the Electromagnetic Field, because it has to do with the space in the neighbourhood of the electric and magnetic bodies, and it may be called a Dynamical Theory, because it assumes that in that space there is matter in motion, by which the observed electromagnetic phenomena are produced

(4) The electromagnetic field is that part of space which contains and surrounds bodies in electric or magnetic conditions

In A Treatise on Electricity and Magnetism of 1873, he writes "the electric field is the portion of space in the neighbourhood of electrified bodies, considered with reference to electric phenomena." And for magnetic fields

lt appears therefore that in the space surrounding a wire transmitting an electric current a magnet is acted on by forces dependent on the position of the wire and on the strength of the current. The space in which these forces act may therefore be considered as a magnetic field, and we may study it in the same way as we have already studied the field in the neighbourhood of ordinary magnets, by tracing the course of the lines of magnetic force, and measuring the intensity of the force at every point.

Maxwell had to settle for the idea of a luminiferous aether. He wrote

We have therefore some reason to believe, from the phenomena of light and heat, that there is an aethereal medium filling space and permeating bodies, capable of being set in motion and of transmitting that motion from one part to another, and of communicating that motion to gross matter so as to heat it and affect it in various ways.

Maxwell was conflicted on the idea on the nature of the fields, he considered the aether to a mechanical medium in order to carry energy.

=== Further developments ===
In 1868 Carl Neumann discussed the idea of the electromagnetic field being an independent energy field.

In 1887, Heinrich Hertz published his experimental evidence of the existence of electromagnetic waves.

In 1903, Karl Schwarzschild wrote the Lagrangian density for the electromagnetic field.

== Relativistic field theory ==
=== Special relativity ===
The 1887 Michelson–Morley experiment attempted to prove that electromagnetic radiation were oscillations of a luminiferous aether; however, the result was negative, indicating that the electromagnetic field could exist and travel in vacuum. To explain this phenomenon, Albert Einstein developed his theory of special relativity (1905) which resolved the conflicts between classical mechanics and electromagnetism. Einstein introduced the Lorentz transformation for electromagnetic fields between reference frames.

=== Space-time as a field ===
Einstein developed the Einstein field equations of general relativity in 1915, consistent with special relativity and that could explain gravitation in terms of a field theory of spacetime. This removed the need of a gravitational aether.

In 1918, Emmy Noether publishes her theorem on the relations between symmetries and conservation laws. Noether's theorem was adapted to general relativity as well as to non-relativistic field theories.

The geometric aspect of space-time can be used to study Newtonian gravitational field. This was developed by Élie Cartan in 1923 and leads to a classically covariant formulation known as geometrized Newtonian gravitation.

== Unification attempts ==
Attempts to create a unified field theory based on classical physics are classical unified field theories. During the years between the two World Wars, the idea of unification of gravity with electromagnetism was actively pursued by several mathematicians and physicists like Einstein, Theodor Kaluza, Hermann Weyl, Arthur Eddington, Gustav Mie and Ernst Reichenbacher.

Early attempts to create such theory were based on incorporation of electromagnetic fields into the geometry of general relativity. In 1918, the case for the first geometrization of the electromagnetic field was proposed in 1918 by Weyl. In this work Weyl coins the term gauge theory. Weyl, in an attempt to generalize the geometrical ideas of general relativity to include electromagnetism, conjectured that Eichinvarianz or invariance under the change of scale (or "gauge") might also be a local symmetry of general relativity.

In 1919, the idea of a five-dimensional approach was suggested by Kaluza. From that, a theory called Kaluza–Klein theory was developed. It attempts to unify gravitation and electromagnetism, in a five-dimensional space-time. There are several ways of extending the representational framework for a unified field theory which have been considered by Einstein and other researchers. These extensions in general are based in two options. The first option is based in relaxing the conditions imposed on the original formulation, and the second is based in introducing other mathematical objects into the theory. An example of the first option is relaxing the restrictions to four-dimensional space-time by considering higher-dimensional representations. That is used in Kaluza–Klein theory. For the second, the most prominent example arises from the concept of the affine connection that was introduced into general relativity mainly through the work of Tullio Levi-Civita and Weyl.

Further development of quantum field theory changed the focus of searching for unified field theory from classical to quantum description. Because of that, many theoretical physicists gave up looking for a classical unified field theory. Quantum field theory would include unification of two other fundamental interactions of nature, the strong and weak nuclear force which act on the subatomic level.

== Quantum fields ==
Fields become the fundamental object of study in quantum field theory. Mathematically, quantum fields are formalized as operator-valued distributions. Although there is no direct method of measuring the fields themselves, the framework asserts that all particles are "excitations" of these fields. For example: whereas Maxwell's theory of classical electromagnetism describes light as a self-propagating wave in the electromagnetic field, in quantum electrodynamics light is the massless gauge boson particle called the photon. Furthermore, the number of particles in an isolated system need not be conserved; an example of a process for which this is the case is bremsstrahlung. More detailed understanding of the framework is obtained by studying the Lagrangian density of a field theory which encodes the information of its allowed particle interactions.

== Modern results ==
In the 1960s, various versions of the no-interaction theorem were postulated, showing that a system of particles cannot interact in special relativity, unless fields are introduced.

== See also ==
- History of classical mechanics
- Corpuscularianism
