= Classical limit =

Approximation or recovery of classical mechanics in certain theories

The classical limit or correspondence limit is the ability of a physical theory to approximate or "recover" classical mechanics when considered over special values of its parameters. The classical limit is used with physical theories that predict non-classical behavior.

== Quantum theory ==
A heuristic postulate called the correspondence principle was introduced to quantum theory by Niels Bohr: in effect it states that some kind of continuity argument should apply to the classical limit of quantum systems as the value of the Planck constant normalized by the action of these systems becomes very small. Often, this is approached through "quasi-classical" techniques (cf. WKB approximation).

More rigorously, the mathematical operation involved in classical limits is a group contraction, approximating physical systems where the relevant action is much larger than the reduced Planck constant ħ, so the "deformation parameter" ħ/S can be effectively taken to be zero (cf. Weyl quantization.) Thus typically, quantum commutators (equivalently, Moyal brackets) reduce to Poisson brackets, in a group contraction.

In quantum mechanics, due to Werner Heisenberg's uncertainty principle, an electron can never be at rest; it must always have a non-zero kinetic energy, a result not found in classical mechanics. For example, if we consider something very large relative to an electron, like a baseball, the uncertainty principle predicts that it cannot really have zero kinetic energy, but the uncertainty in kinetic energy is so small that the baseball can effectively appear to be at rest, and hence it appears to obey classical mechanics. In general, if large energies and large objects (relative to the size and energy levels of an electron) are considered in quantum mechanics, the result will appear to obey classical mechanics. The typical occupation numbers involved are huge: a macroscopic harmonic oscillator with ω = 2 Hz, m = 10 g, and maximum amplitude x_{0} = 10 cm, has S ≈ E/ω ≈ mωx^{2}_{0}/2 ≈ 10^{−4} kg·m^{2}/s = ħn, so that n ≃ 10^{30}. Further see coherent states. It is less clear, however, how the classical limit applies to chaotic systems, a field known as quantum chaos.

Quantum mechanics and classical mechanics are usually treated with entirely different formalisms: quantum theory using Hilbert space, and classical mechanics using a representation in phase space. One can bring the two into a common mathematical framework in various ways. In the phase space formulation of quantum mechanics, which is statistical in nature, logical connections between quantum mechanics and classical statistical mechanics are made, enabling natural comparisons between them, including the violations of Liouville's theorem upon quantization.

In a crucial paper (1933), Paul Dirac explained how classical mechanics is an emergent phenomenon of quantum mechanics: destructive interference among paths with non-extremal macroscopic actions S » ħ obliterate amplitude contributions in the path integral he introduced, leaving the extremal action S_{class}, thus the classical action path as the dominant contribution, an observation further elaborated by Richard Feynman in his 1942 PhD dissertation. (Further see quantum decoherence.)

== Time-evolution of expectation values ==
One simple way to compare classical to quantum mechanics is to consider the time-evolution of the expected position and expected momentum, which can then be compared to the time-evolution of the ordinary position and momentum in classical mechanics. The quantum expectation values satisfy the Ehrenfest theorem. For a one-dimensional quantum particle moving in a potential $V$, the Ehrenfest theorem says

$$m\frac{d}{dt}\langle x\rangle = \langle p\rangle;\quad \frac{d}{dt}\langle p\rangle =  -\left\langle V'(X)\right\rangle .$$

Although the first of these equations is consistent with the classical mechanics, the second is not: If the pair $(\langle X\rangle,\langle P\rangle)$ were to satisfy Newton's second law, the right-hand side of the second equation would have read

$$\frac{d}{dt}\langle p\rangle =-V'\left(\left\langle X\right\rangle\right)$$.

But in most cases,

$$\left\langle V'(X)\right\rangle\neq V'(\left\langle X\right\rangle)$$.

If for example, the potential $V$ is cubic, then $V'$ is quadratic, in which case, we are talking about the distinction between $\langle X^2\rangle$ and $\langle X\rangle^2$, which differ by $(\Delta X)^2$.

An exception occurs in case when the classical equations of motion are linear, that is, when $V$ is quadratic and $V'$ is linear. In that special case, $V'\left(\left\langle X\right\rangle\right)$ and $\left\langle V'(X)\right\rangle$ do agree. In particular, for a free particle or a quantum harmonic oscillator, the expected position and expected momentum exactly follows solutions of Newton's equations.

For general systems, the best we can hope for is that the expected position and momentum will approximately follow the classical trajectories. If the wave function is highly concentrated around a point $x_0$, then $V'\left(\left\langle X\right\rangle\right)$ and $\left\langle V'(X)\right\rangle$ will be almost the same, since both will be approximately equal to $V'(x_0)$. In that case, the expected position and expected momentum will remain very close to the classical trajectories, at least for as long as the wave function remains highly localized in position.

Now, if the initial state is very localized in position, it will be very spread out in momentum, and thus we expect that the wave function will rapidly spread out, and the connection with the classical trajectories will be lost. When the Planck constant is small, however, it is possible to have a state that is well localized in both position and momentum. The small uncertainty in momentum ensures that the particle remains well localized in position for a long time, so that expected position and momentum continue to closely track the classical trajectories for a long time.

== Relativity and other deformations ==
Other familiar deformations in physics involve:

- The deformation of classical Newtonian into relativistic mechanics (special relativity), with deformation parameter v/c; the classical limit involves small speeds, so v/c → 0, and the systems appear to obey Newtonian mechanics.
- Similarly for the deformation of Newtonian gravity into general relativity, with deformation parameter Schwarzschild-radius/characteristic-dimension, we find that objects once again appear to obey classical mechanics (flat space), when the mass of an object times the square of the Planck length is much smaller than its size and the sizes of the problem addressed. See Newtonian limit.
- Wave optics might also be regarded as a deformation of ray optics for deformation parameter λ/a.
- Likewise, thermodynamics deforms to statistical mechanics with deformation parameter 1/N.

== See also ==
- Classical probability density
- Ehrenfest theorem
- Madelung equations
- Fresnel integral
- Mathematical formulation of quantum mechanics
- Quantum chaos
- Quantum decoherence
- Quantum limit
- Semiclassical physics
- Wigner–Weyl transform
- WKB approximation
