= Newtonian limit =

Approximation applicable to physical systems

In physics, the Newtonian limit is a mathematical approximation applicable to physical systems exhibiting (1) weak gravitation, (2) objects moving slowly compared to the speed of light, and (3) slowly changing (or completely static) gravitational fields. Under these conditions, Newton's law of universal gravitation may be used to obtain values that are accurate. In general, and in the presence of significant gravitation, the general theory of relativity must be used.

In the Newtonian limit, spacetime is approximately flat and the Minkowski metric may be used over finite distances. In this case 'approximately flat' is defined as space in which gravitational effect approaches 0, mathematically actual spacetime and Minkowski space are not identical, Minkowski space is an idealized model.

== Special relativity ==
In special relativity, Newtonian behaviour can in most cases be obtained by performing the limit $v\to 0$. In this limit, the often appearing gamma factor becomes 1
$$\begin{align}
\gamma=\frac{1}{\sqrt{1-v^2/c^2}}&\to 1
\end{align}$$
and the Lorentz transformations between reference frames turn into Galileo transformations
$$\begin{align}
t'=\gamma(t-v/c^2\,x)&\to t'=t \\
x'=\gamma(x-v\,t)&\to x'=x-v\,t
\end{align}$$

== General relativity ==
The geodesic equation for a free particle on curved spacetime with metric $g^{\mu\nu}$ can be derived from the action
$$\begin{align}
S[x,\dot{x}]&=-m\,c\,\int dt \,\sqrt{-g_{\mu\nu}\,\dot{x}^\mu\,\dot{x}^\nu}
\end{align}$$
If the spacetime-metric is
$$\begin{align}
g&=\begin{pmatrix}
-1-\frac{2\,\phi(x)}{c^2} & 0 & 0 & 0\\
0 & 1 & 0 & 0\\
0 & 0 & 1 & 0\\
0 & 0 & 0 & 1
\end{pmatrix}
\end{align}$$
then, ignoring all contributions of order $\frac{1}{c^2}$ the action becomes
$$\begin{align}
S[x,\dot{x}]&=-m\,c\,\int dt \,\sqrt{c^2+ 2\,\phi(x)-\dot{\mathbf{x} }^2 }\\
&= -m\,c\,\int dt \,\left(\sqrt{c^2} + \frac{1}{2\,\sqrt{c^2}}\,\left(2\,\phi(x) - \dot{\mathbf{x}}^2\right)+...\right)\\
&\approx \int dt \,\left( -m\,c^2 + \frac{1}{2}m\dot{\mathbf{x}}^2 -m\,\phi(x)\right)
\end{align}$$
which is the action that reproduces the Newtonian equations of motion of a particle in a gravitational potential $\phi(x)$

== See also ==
- Classical limit
