= Ehrenfest theorem =

Theorem in quantum mechanics

The Ehrenfest theorem, named after Austrian theoretical physicist Paul Ehrenfest, relates the time derivative of the expectation values of the position and momentum operators x and p to the expectation value of the force $F=-V'(x)$ on a massive particle moving in a scalar potential $V(x)$,

$m\frac{d}{dt}\langle x\rangle = \langle p\rangle,\;\; \frac{d}{dt}\langle p\rangle = -\left\langle V'(x)\right\rangle ~.$

The Ehrenfest theorem is a special case of a more general relation between the expectation of any quantum mechanical operator and the expectation of the commutator of that operator with the Hamiltonian of the system

$\frac{d}{dt}\langle A\rangle = \frac{1}{i\hbar}\langle [A,H] \rangle+ \left\langle \frac{\partial A}{\partial t}\right\rangle ~,$

where A is some quantum mechanical operator and ⟨A⟩ is its expectation value.

It is most apparent in the Heisenberg picture of quantum mechanics, where it amounts to just the expectation value of the Heisenberg equation of motion. It provides mathematical support to the correspondence principle.

The reason is that Ehrenfest's theorem is closely related to Liouville's theorem of Hamiltonian mechanics, which involves the Poisson bracket instead of a commutator. Dirac's rule of thumb suggests that statements in quantum mechanics that contain a commutator correspond to statements in classical mechanics where the commutator is supplanted by a Poisson bracket multiplied by iħ. This makes the operator expectation values obey corresponding classical equations of motion, provided the Hamiltonian is at most quadratic in the coordinates and momenta. Otherwise, the evolution equations still may hold approximately, provided fluctuations are small.

== Relation to classical physics ==
Although, at first glance, it might appear that the Ehrenfest theorem is saying that the quantum mechanical expectation values obey Newton's classical equations of motion, this is not actually the case. If the pair $(\langle x\rangle,\langle p\rangle)$ were to satisfy Newton's second law, the right-hand side of the second equation would have to be
$$-V'\left(\left\langle x\right\rangle\right),$$
which is typically not the same as
$$-\left\langle V'(x)\right\rangle.$$
If for example, the potential $V(x)$ is cubic, (i.e. proportional to $x^3$), then $V'$ is quadratic (proportional to $x^2$). This means, in the case of Newton's second law, the right side would be in the form of $\langle x\rangle^2$, while in the Ehrenfest theorem it is in the form of $\langle x^2\rangle$. The difference between these two quantities is the square of the uncertainty in $x$ and is therefore nonzero.

An exception occurs in case when the classical equations of motion are linear, that is, when $V$ is quadratic and $V'$ is linear. In that special case, $V'\left(\left\langle x\right\rangle\right)$ and $\left\langle V'(x)\right\rangle$ do agree. Thus, for the case of a quantum harmonic oscillator, the expected position and expected momentum do exactly follow the classical trajectories.

For general systems, if the wave function is highly concentrated around a point $x_0$, then $V'\left(\left\langle x\right\rangle\right)$ and $\left\langle V'(x)\right\rangle$ will be almost the same, since both will be approximately equal to $V'(x_0)$. In that case, the expected position and expected momentum will approximately follow the classical trajectories, at least for as long as the wave function remains localized in position.

== Derivation in the Schrödinger picture ==
Suppose some system is presently in a quantum state Φ. If we want to know the instantaneous time derivative of the expectation value of A, that is, by definition
$$\begin{align}
\frac{d}{dt}\langle A\rangle &= \frac{d}{dt}\int \Phi^* A \Phi \, d^3x \\
&= \int \left( \frac{\partial \Phi^*}{\partial t} \right) A\Phi\,d^3x + \int \Phi^* \left( \frac{\partial A}{\partial t}\right) \Phi \, d^3x +\int \Phi^* A \left( \frac{\partial \Phi}{\partial t} \right) \, d^3x \\
&= \int \left( \frac{\partial \Phi^*}{\partial t} \right) A\Phi\,d^3x + \left\langle \frac{\partial A}{\partial t}\right\rangle + \int \Phi^* A \left( \frac{\partial \Phi}{\partial t} \right) \, d^3x
\end{align}$$
where we are integrating over all of space. If we apply the Schrödinger equation, we find that
$$\frac{\partial \Phi}{\partial t} = \frac{1}{i\hbar}H\Phi$$

By taking the complex conjugate we find
$$\frac{\partial \Phi^*}{\partial t} = -\frac{1}{i\hbar}\Phi^*H^* = -\frac{1}{i\hbar}\Phi^*H.$$

Note H = H ^{∗}, because the Hamiltonian is Hermitian. Placing this into the above equation we have

$$\frac{d}{dt}\langle A\rangle = \frac{1}{i\hbar}\int \Phi^* (AH-HA) \Phi~d^3x + \left\langle \frac{\partial A}{\partial t}\right\rangle = \frac{1}{i\hbar}\langle [A,H]\rangle + \left\langle \frac{\partial A}{\partial t}\right\rangle.$$

Often (but not always) the operator A is time-independent so that its derivative is zero and we can ignore the last term.

== Derivation in the Heisenberg picture ==
In the Heisenberg picture, the derivation is straightforward. The Heisenberg picture moves the time dependence of the system to operators instead of state vectors. Starting with the Heisenberg equation of motion,
$$\frac{d}{dt}A(t) = \frac{\partial A(t)}{\partial t} + \frac{1}{i \hbar}[A(t),H],$$
Ehrenfest's theorem follows simply upon projecting the Heisenberg equation onto $|\Psi\rangle$ from the right and $\langle\Psi|$ from the left, or taking the expectation value, so
$$\left\langle\Psi\left|\frac{d}{dt}A(t)\right|\Psi\right\rangle = \left\langle\Psi\left|\frac{\partial A(t)}{\partial t}\right|\Psi\right\rangle + \left\langle\Psi\left|\frac{1}{i \hbar}[A(t),H]\right|\Psi\right\rangle,$$

One may pull the d/dt out of the first term, since the state vectors are no longer time dependent in the Heisenberg Picture. Therefore,
$$\frac{d}{dt}\langle A(t)\rangle = \left\langle\frac{\partial A(t)}{\partial t}\right\rangle + \frac{1}{i \hbar}\left\langle[A(t),H]\right\rangle .$$

== General example ==
For the very general example of a massive particle moving in a potential, the Hamiltonian is simply
$$H(x,p,t) = \frac{p^2}{2m} + V(x,t)$$
where x is the position of the particle.

Suppose we wanted to know the instantaneous change in the expectation of the momentum p. Using Ehrenfest's theorem, we have
$$\frac{d}{dt}\langle p\rangle = \frac{1}{i\hbar}\langle [p,H]\rangle + \left\langle \frac{\partial p}{\partial t}\right\rangle = \frac{1}{i\hbar}\langle [p,V(x,t)]\rangle,$$

since the operator p commutes with itself and has no time dependence. By expanding the right-hand-side, replacing p by −iħ∇, we get
$$\frac{d}{dt}\langle p\rangle = \int \Phi^* V(x,t)\frac{\partial}{\partial x}\Phi~dx - \int \Phi^* \frac{\partial}{\partial x} (V(x,t)\Phi)~dx ~.$$

After applying the product rule on the second term, we have
$$\begin{align}
\frac{d}{dt}\langle p\rangle &= \int \Phi^* V(x,t) \frac{\partial}{\partial x}\Phi~dx - \int \Phi^* \left(\frac{\partial}{\partial x} V(x,t)\right)\Phi ~dx - \int \Phi^* V(x,t) \frac{\partial}{\partial x}\Phi~dx \\
&= - \int \Phi^* \left(\frac{\partial}{\partial x} V(x,t)\right)\Phi ~dx \\
&= \left\langle - \frac{\partial}{\partial x} V(x,t)\right\rangle = \langle F \rangle.
\end{align}$$

As explained in the introduction, this result does not say that the pair $(\langle X\rangle,\langle P\rangle)$ satisfies Newton's second law, because the right-hand side of the formula is $\langle F(x,t)\rangle,$ rather than $F(\langle X\rangle,t)$. Nevertheless, as explained in the introduction, for states that are highly localized in space, the expected position and momentum will approximately follow classical trajectories, which may be understood as an instance of the correspondence principle.

Similarly, we can obtain the instantaneous change in the position expectation value.
$$\begin{align}
\frac{d}{dt}\langle x\rangle &= \frac{1}{i\hbar}\langle [x,H]\rangle + \left\langle \frac{\partial x}{\partial t}\right\rangle \\[5pt]
&= \frac{1}{i\hbar} \left \langle \left [x,\frac{p^2}{2m} + V(x,t) \right ] \right \rangle + 0 \\[5pt]
&= \frac{1}{i\hbar} \left \langle \left [x,\frac{p^2}{2m} \right] \right \rangle \\[5pt]
&= \frac{1}{i\hbar 2 m} \left \langle [x,p] \frac{d}{dp} p^2 \right\rangle \\[5pt]
&= \frac{1}{i\hbar 2 m}\langle i \hbar 2 p\rangle \\[5pt]
&= \frac{1}{m}\langle p\rangle
\end{align}$$

This result is actually in exact accord with the classical equation.

== Derivation of the Schrödinger equation from the Ehrenfest theorems ==
It was established above that the Ehrenfest theorems are consequences of the Schrödinger equation. However, the converse is also true: the Schrödinger equation can be inferred from the Ehrenfest theorems, assuming that the evolution of the quantum state is given by

$$\vert\Psi(t)\rangle = U(t)\vert\Psi(0)\rangle,$$

where U(t) is a strongly continuous unitary one-parameter group. We begin from
$$\begin{align}
m\frac{d}{dt} \left \langle \Psi(t) \right | \hat{x} \left | \Psi(t) \right \rangle &= \left \langle \Psi(t) \right | \hat{p} \left | \Psi(t) \right \rangle, \\[5pt]
\frac{d}{dt} \left \langle \Psi(t) \right | \hat{p} \left | \Psi(t) \right \rangle &= \left \langle \Psi(t) \right | -V'(\hat{x}) \left | \Psi(t) \right \rangle.
\end{align}$$

Application of the product rule leads to
$$\begin{align}
\left \langle \frac{d\Psi}{dt} \Big | \hat{x} \Big | \Psi \right \rangle + \left \langle \Psi \Big | \hat{x} \Big | \frac{d\Psi}{dt} \right \rangle &= \left \langle \Psi \Big | \frac{\hat{p}}{m} \Big | \Psi \right \rangle, \\[5pt]
\left \langle \frac{d\Psi}{dt} \Big | \hat{p} \Big | \Psi \right \rangle + \left \langle \Psi \Big | \hat{p} \Big | \frac{d\Psi}{dt} \right \rangle &= \langle \Psi | -V'(\hat{x}) | \Psi \rangle,
\end{align}$$
Here, apply Stone's theorem, using Ĥ to denote the quantum generator of time translation. The next step is to show that this is the same as the Hamiltonian operator used in quantum mechanics. Stone's theorem implies
$$i\hbar \left | \frac{d\Psi}{dt} \right \rangle = \hat{H} | \Psi(t) \rangle ~,$$
where ħ was introduced as a normalization constant to the balance dimensionality. Since these identities must be valid for any initial state, the averaging can be dropped and the system of commutator equations for Ĥ are derived:
$$im [\hat{H}, \hat{x}] = \hbar \hat{p}, \qquad i [\hat{H}, \hat{p}] = -\hbar V'(\hat{x}).$$

Assuming that observables of the coordinate and momentum obey the canonical commutation relation [x̂, p̂] = iħ. Setting $\hat{H} = H(\hat{x}, \hat{p})$, the commutator equations can be converted into the differential equations
$$m \frac{\partial H (x,p)}{\partial p} = p, \qquad \frac{\partial H(x,p)}{\partial x} = V'(x),$$
whose solution is the familiar quantum Hamiltonian
$$\hat{H} = \frac{\hat{p}^2}{2m} + V(\hat{x}).$$

Whence, the Schrödinger equation was derived from the Ehrenfest theorems by assuming the canonical commutation relation between the coordinate and momentum. If one assumes that the coordinate and momentum commute, the same computational method leads to the Koopman–von Neumann classical mechanics, which is the Hilbert space formulation of classical mechanics. Therefore, this derivation as well as the derivation of the Koopman–von Neumann mechanics, shows that the essential difference between quantum and classical mechanics reduces to the value of the commutator [x̂, p̂].

The implications of the Ehrenfest theorem for systems with classically chaotic dynamics are discussed at Scholarpedia article Ehrenfest time and chaos. Due to exponential instability of classical trajectories the Ehrenfest time, on which there is a complete correspondence between quantum and classical evolution, is shown to be logarithmically short being proportional to a logarithm of typical quantum number. For the case of integrable dynamics this time scale is much larger being proportional to a certain power of quantum number.
