= Koopman–von Neumann classical mechanics =

Formulation of classical mechanics in terms of Hilbert spaces

The Koopman–von Neumann (KvN) theory is a description of classical mechanics as an operatorial theory similar to quantum mechanics, based on a Hilbert space of complex, square-integrable functions representing classical observables on phase spaces. As its name suggests, the KvN theory was developed by Bernard Koopman and John von Neumann.

The KvN theory is mathematically related to the conceptually distinct method of classical wavefunctions originally introduced by Mario Schönberg and others. These two methods will collectively be called Hilbert-space formulations of classical mechanics in what follows.

== History ==
=== Statistical Mechanics and Ergodic Theory ===
Statistical mechanics describes macroscopic systems in terms of statistical ensembles, such as the macroscopic properties of an ideal gas. Ergodic theory is a branch of mathematics arising from the study of statistical mechanics.

The origins of the Koopman–von Neumann theory are tightly connected with the rise of ergodic theory as an independent branch of mathematics, in particular with Ludwig Boltzmann's ergodic hypothesis.

In 1931, Koopman observed that the phase space of the classical system can be converted into a Hilbert space. According to this formulation, functions representing physical observables become vectors, with an inner product defined in terms of a natural integration rule over the system's probability density on phase space. This reformulation makes it possible to draw interesting conclusions about the evolution of physical observables from Stone's theorem, which had been proved shortly before. This finding inspired von Neumann to apply the novel formalism to the ergodic problem in 1932. Subsequently, he published several seminal results in modern ergodic theory, including the proof of his mean ergodic theorem.

=== Schönberg's Method of Classical Wavefunctions ===
Independently, several researchers developed a framework for representing classical probability distributions on phase spaces with complex-valued wavefunctions. This method of classical wavefunctions is conceptually distinct from the KvN theory, which was based on treating functions representing classical observables on phase spaces as the elementary vectors of Hilbert spaces.

The method of classical wavefunctions was developed by Mário Schönberg in 1952-1953, Angelo Loinger in 1962, Giacomo Della Riccia and Norbert Wiener in 1966, and E. C. George Sudarshan in 1976. In particular, Loinger established an isomorphism between the Hilbert spaces of classical wavefunctions and KvN Hilbert spaces, yielding an overall Hilbert-space framework for classical mechanics.

In 2001, Danilo Mauro made important advances to the line of work tracing back to Schönberg but Mauro attributed the concepts to Koopman and von Neumann. Since that time the method of classical wave functions became conflated with the KvN theory, despite being conceptually different theories with different origins.

== Definition and dynamics ==
=== Derivation starting from the Liouville equation ===
In the method of classical wavefunctions, as part of Hilbert-space classical mechanics, dynamics in phase space is described by a (classical) probability density, recovered from an underlying wavefunction – the classical wavefunction – as the square of its absolute value (more precisely, as the amplitude multiplied with its own complex conjugate). This stands in analogy to the Born rule in quantum mechanics. In Hilbert-space classical mechanics, observables are represented by commuting self-adjoint operators acting on the Hilbert space of classical wavefunctions. The commutativity physically implies that all observables are simultaneously measurable. Contrast this with quantum mechanics, where observables need not commute, which underlines the uncertainty principle, Kochen–Specker theorem, and Bell inequalities.

The classical wavefunction is postulated to evolve according to exactly the same Liouville equation as the classical probability density. From this postulate it can be shown that indeed probability density dynamics is recovered.

Dynamics of the probability density (proof)

In classical statistical mechanics, the probability density (with respect to Liouville measure) obeys the Liouville equation
$$i\frac{\partial}{\partial t} \rho (x, p, t) = \hat{L} \rho(x, p, t)$$
with the self-adjoint Liouvillian
$$\hat{L} = - i\frac{\partial H(x, p)}{\partial p}  \frac{\partial}{\partial x} + i\frac{\partial H(x, p)}{\partial x} \frac{\partial}{\partial p},$$
where $H(x,p)$ denotes the classical Hamiltonian (i.e. the Liouvillian is $i$ times the Hamiltonian vector field considered as a first order differential operator). The same dynamical equation is postulated for the classical wavefunction
$$i\frac{\partial}{\partial t} \psi (x, p, t) = \hat{L} \psi (x, p, t),$$
thus
$$\frac{\partial}{\partial t} \psi(x, p, t) = \left[- \frac{\partial H(x, p)}{\partial p}  \frac{\partial}{\partial x} + \frac{\partial H(x, p)}{\partial x} \frac{\partial}{\partial p} \right] \psi(x, p, t),$$
and for its complex conjugate
$$\frac{\partial}{\partial t} \psi^*(x, p, t) = \left[- \frac{\partial H(x, p)}{\partial p}  \frac{\partial}{\partial x} + \frac{\partial H(x, p)}{\partial x} \frac{\partial}{\partial p} \right] \psi^*(x, p, t).$$
From
$$\rho(x, p, t) = \psi^*(x, p, t) \psi(x, p, t)$$
follows using the product rule that
$$\frac{\partial}{\partial t} \rho(x, p, t) = \left[- \frac{\partial H(x, p)}{\partial p}  \frac{\partial}{\partial x} + \frac{\partial H(x, p)}{\partial x} \frac{\partial}{\partial p} \right] \rho(x, p, t)$$
which proves that probability density dynamics can be recovered from the classical wavefunction.

Remark
The last step of this derivation relies on the classical Liouville operator containing only first-order derivatives in the coordinate and momentum; this is not the case in quantum mechanics where the Schrödinger equation contains second-order derivatives.

=== Derivation starting from operator axioms ===
Conversely, it is possible to start from operator postulates, similar to the Hilbert-space axioms of quantum mechanics, and derive the equation of motion by specifying how expectation values evolve.

The relevant axioms are that as in quantum mechanics (i) the states of a system are represented by normalized vectors of a complex Hilbert space, and the observables are given by self-adjoint operators acting on that space, (ii) the expectation value of an observable is obtained in the manner as the expectation value in quantum mechanics, (iii) the probabilities of measuring certain values of some observables are calculated by the Born rule, and (iv) the state space of a composite system is the tensor product of the subsystem's spaces.

Mathematical form of the operator axioms

The above axioms (i) to (iv), with the inner product written in the bra–ket notation, are

1. $\langle \psi(t) | \psi(t) \rangle = 1$,
2. The expectation value of an observable $\hat{A}$ at time $t$ is $\langle A (t)\rangle = \langle \Psi (t)| \hat{A} | \Psi(t) \rangle.$
3. The probability that a measurement of an observable $\hat{A}$ at time $t$ yields $A$ is $\left|\langle A | \Psi(t)\rangle \right|^2$, where $\hat{A} |A\rangle = A |A \rangle$. (This axiom is an analogue of the Born rule in quantum mechanics.)
4. (see Tensor product of Hilbert spaces).

These axioms allow us to recover the formalism of both classical and quantum mechanics. Specifically, under the assumption that the classical position and momentum operators commute, the Liouville equation for the classical wavefunction is recovered from averaged Newton's laws of motion. However, if the coordinate and momentum obey the canonical commutation relation, the Schrödinger equation of quantum mechanics is obtained.

Derivation of classical mechanics from the operator axioms

We begin from the following equations for expectation values of the coordinate x and momentum p

$$m\frac{d}{dt} \langle x \rangle = \langle p \rangle, \qquad \frac{d}{dt} \langle p \rangle =\langle -U'(x) \rangle,$$

aka, Newton's laws of motion averaged over ensemble. With the help of the operator axioms, they can be rewritten as

$$\begin{align}
m\frac{d}{dt} \langle \Psi(t) | \hat{x} | \Psi(t) \rangle &= \langle \Psi(t) | \hat{p} | \Psi(t) \rangle, \\
\frac{d}{dt} \langle \Psi(t) | \hat{p} | \Psi(t) \rangle &= \langle \Psi(t) | -U'(\hat{x}) | \Psi(t) \rangle.
\end{align}$$

Notice a close resemblance with Ehrenfest theorems in quantum mechanics. Applications of the product rule leads to

$$\begin{align}
\langle d\Psi/dt | \hat{x} | \Psi \rangle + \langle \Psi | \hat{x} | d\Psi/dt \rangle &= \langle \Psi | \hat{p}/m | \Psi \rangle, \\
\langle d\Psi/dt | \hat{p} | \Psi \rangle  + \langle \Psi | \hat{p} | d\Psi/dt \rangle & = \langle \Psi | -U'(\hat{x}) | \Psi \rangle,
\end{align}$$

into which we substitute a consequence of Stone's theorem $i | d\Psi(t)/dt \rangle = \hat{L} | \Psi(t) \rangle$ and obtain

$$\begin{align}
im \langle \Psi(t) | [\hat{L}, \hat{x} ] | \Psi(t) \rangle &= \langle \Psi(t)| \hat{p} |\Psi(t)\rangle,  \\
i \langle \Psi(t) | [\hat{L}, \hat{p}] | \Psi(t)\rangle &= - \langle \Psi(t)| U'(\hat{x}) |\Psi(t)\rangle.
\end{align}$$

Since these identities must be valid for any initial state, the averaging can be dropped and the system of commutator equations for the unknown $\hat{L}$ is derived

$im [\hat{L}, \hat{x}] = \hat{p} , \qquad i [\hat{L}, \hat{p}] = -U'(\hat{x}).$	commutator eqs for L

Assume that the coordinate and momentum commute $[ \hat{x}, \hat{p} ] = 0$. This assumption physically means that the classical particle's coordinate and momentum can be measured simultaneously, implying absence of the uncertainty principle.

The solution $\hat{L}$ cannot be simply of the form $\hat{L} = L(\hat{x}, \hat{p})$ because it would imply the contractions $im [L(\hat{x}, \hat{p}), \hat{x}] = 0 = \hat{p}$ and $i [L(\hat{x}, \hat{p}), \hat{p}] = 0 = -U'(\hat{x})$. Therefore, we must utilize additional operators $\hat{\lambda}_x$ and $\hat{\lambda}_p$ obeying

$[ \hat{x}, \hat{\lambda}_x ] = [ \hat{p}, \hat{\lambda}_p ] = i, \quad [\hat{x}, \hat{p}] = [ \hat{x}, \hat{\lambda}_p ] = [ \hat{p}, \hat{\lambda}_x ] = [ \hat{\lambda}_x, \hat{\lambda}_p ] = 0.$	Hilbert-space algebra

The need to employ these auxiliary operators arises because all classical observables commute. Now we seek $\hat{L}$ in the form $\hat{L} = L(\hat{x}, \hat{\lambda}_x, \hat{p}, \hat{\lambda}_p)$. Utilizing Hilbert-space algebra, the commutator eqs for L can be converted into the following differential equations:

$$m L'_{\lambda_x} (x, \lambda_x, p, \lambda_p) = p, \qquad L'_{\lambda_p} (x, \lambda_x, p, \lambda_p) = -U'(x).$$

Whence, we conclude that the classical wave function $|\Psi(t)\rangle$ evolves according to the Schrödinger-like equation of motion

$i\frac{d}{dt} |\Psi(t)\rangle = \hat{L} |\Psi(t)\rangle, \qquad \hat{L} = \frac{\hat{p}}{m} \hat{\lambda}_x - U'(\hat{x}) \hat{\lambda}_p.$	Hilbert-space dynamical eq

Let us explicitly show that Hilbert-space dynamical eq is equivalent to the classical Liouville mechanics.

Since $\hat{x}$ and $\hat{p}$ commute, they share the common eigenvectors

$\hat{x} |x,p\rangle = x |x,p\rangle, \quad \hat{p} |x,p\rangle = p |x,p\rangle , \quad A(\hat{x}, \hat{p}) |x,p\rangle = A(x,p) |x,p\rangle,$	xp eigenvec

with the resolution of the identity $1 = \int dx \, dp \, |x,p\rangle \langle x,p|.$ Then, one obtains from equation (Hilbert-space algebra)
$$\langle x,p| \hat{\lambda}_x | \Psi \rangle =  -i \frac{\partial}{\partial x} \langle x,p | \Psi \rangle, \qquad
\langle x,p| \hat{\lambda}_p | \Psi \rangle =  -i \frac{\partial}{\partial p} \langle x,p | \Psi \rangle.$$
Projecting equation (Hilbert-space dynamical eq) onto $\langle x,p|$, we get the equation of motion for the classical wave function in the xp-representation

$\left[ \frac{\partial }{\partial t} + \frac{p}{m} \frac{\partial}{\partial x} - U'(x) \frac{\partial}{\partial p} \right] \langle x,p | \Psi(t) \rangle = 0.$	Hilbert-space dynamical eq in xp

The quantity $\langle x,\, p |\Psi(t) \rangle$ is the probability amplitude for a classical particle to be at point $x$ with momentum $p$ at time $t$. According to the axioms above, the probability density is given by $\rho(x,p;t) = \left| \langle x, p |\Psi(t) \rangle \right|^2$. Utilizing the identity
$$\frac{\partial }{\partial t} \rho(x,p;t) = \langle \Psi(t) | x, p \rangle \frac{\partial }{\partial t} \langle x, p |\Psi(t) \rangle
+ \langle x, p |\Psi(t) \rangle \left( \frac{\partial }{\partial t}  \langle x, p |\Psi(t) \rangle \right)^*$$
as well as (Hilbert-space dynamical eq in xp), we recover the classical Liouville equation

$\left[ \frac{\partial }{\partial t} + \frac{p}{m} \frac{\partial}{\partial x} - U'(x) \frac{\partial}{\partial p} \right] \rho(x,p;t) = 0.$	Liouville eq

Moreover, according to the operator axioms and (xp eigenvec),
$$\begin{align}
\langle A \rangle  &=  \langle \Psi (t)| A(\hat{x}, \hat{p}) | \Psi(t) \rangle
= \int dx \, dp \, \langle \Psi (t)| x,p\rangle A(x, p) \langle x,p | \Psi(t) \rangle \\
& = \int dx \, dp \,  A(x, p) \langle \Psi (t)| x,p\rangle \langle x,p | \Psi(t) \rangle
= \int dx \, dp \,  A(x, p) \rho(x,p;t).
\end{align}$$
Therefore, the rule for calculating averages of observable $A(x,p)$ in classical statistical mechanics has been recovered from the operator axioms with the additional assumption $[ \hat{x}, \hat{p} ] = 0$. As a result, the phase of a classical wave function does not contribute to observable averages. Contrary to quantum mechanics, the phase of a classical wave function is physically irrelevant. Hence, nonexistence of the double-slit experiment as well as Aharonov–Bohm effect is established in Hilbert-space classical mechanics.

Projecting Hilbert-space dynamical eq onto the common eigenvector of the operators $\hat{x}$ and $\hat{\lambda}_p$ (i.e., $x\lambda_p$-representation), one obtains classical mechanics in the doubled configuration space, whose generalization leads to the phase space formulation of quantum mechanics.

Derivation of quantum mechanics from the operator axioms

As in the derivation of classical mechanics, we begin from the following equations for averages of coordinate x and momentum p

$$m\frac{d}{dt} \langle x \rangle = \langle p \rangle, \qquad \frac{d}{dt} \langle p \rangle =\langle -U'(x) \rangle.$$

With the help of the operator axioms, they can be rewritten as

$$\begin{align}
m\frac{d}{dt} \langle \Psi(t) | \hat{x} | \Psi(t) \rangle &= \langle \Psi(t) | \hat{p} | \Psi(t) \rangle, \\
\frac{d}{dt} \langle \Psi(t) | \hat{p} | \Psi(t) \rangle &= \langle \Psi(t) | -U'(\hat{x}) | \Psi(t) \rangle.
\end{align}$$

These are the Ehrenfest theorems in quantum mechanics. Applications of the product rule leads to

$$\begin{align}
\langle d\Psi/dt | \hat{x} | \Psi \rangle + \langle \Psi | \hat{x} | d\Psi/dt \rangle &= \langle \Psi | \hat{p}/m | \Psi \rangle, \\
\langle d\Psi/dt | \hat{p} | \Psi \rangle  + \langle \Psi | \hat{p} | d\Psi/dt \rangle & = \langle \Psi | -U'(\hat{x}) | \Psi \rangle,
\end{align}$$

into which we substitute a consequence of Stone's theorem

$$i\hbar | d \Psi(t)/dt \rangle = \hat{H} | \Psi(t) \rangle,$$

where $\hbar$ was introduced as a normalization constant to balance dimensionality. Since these identities must be valid for any initial state, the averaging can be dropped and the system of commutator equations for the unknown quantum generator of motion $\hat{H}$ are derived

$$im [\hat{H}, \hat{x}] = \hbar \hat{p}, \qquad i [\hat{H}, \hat{p}] = -\hbar U'(\hat{x}).$$

Contrary to the case of classical mechanics, we assume that observables of the coordinate and momentum obey the canonical commutation relation $[ \hat{x}, \hat{p} ] = i\hbar$. Setting $\hat{H} = H(\hat{x}, \hat{p})$, the commutator equations can be converted into the differential equations

$$m H'_p (x,p) = p, \qquad H'_x (x,p) = U'(x),$$

whose solution is the familiar quantum Hamiltonian

$$\hat{H} = \frac{\hat{p}^2}{2m} + U(\hat{x}).$$

Whence, the Schrödinger equation was derived from the Ehrenfest theorems by assuming the canonical commutation relation between the coordinate and momentum. This derivation as well as the derivation of Hilbert-space classical mechanics shows that the difference between quantum and classical mechanics essentially boils down to the value of the commutator $[ \hat{x}, \hat{p} ]$.

=== Measurements ===
In Hilbert-space classical mechanics, the classical wavefunction takes the form of a superposition of eigenstates, and measurement collapses the classical wavefunction to the eigenstate which is associated the measurement result, in analogy to the wave function collapse of quantum mechanics.

However, Mauro showed that, in his approach, non-selective measurements leave the classical wavefunction unchanged.

== Hilbert-space classical mechanics vs Liouville mechanics ==
The dynamical equation for Hilbert-space classical mechanics (Hilbert-space dynamical eq in xp) and the Liouville equation (Liouville eq) are first-order linear partial differential equations. One recovers Newton's laws of motion by applying the method of characteristics to either of these equations. Hence, the key difference between Hilbert-space classical mechanics and Liouville mechanics lies in weighting individual trajectories: Arbitrary weights, underlying the classical wave function, can be utilized in Hilbert-space classical mechanics, while only positive weights, representing the probability density, are permitted in the Liouville mechanics (see this scheme).

== Quantum analogy ==
Being explicitly based on the Hilbert space language, the Hilbert-space approach to classical mechanics adopts many techniques from quantum mechanics, for example, perturbation and diagram techniques as well as functional integral methods. Hilbert-space classical mechanics is very general, and it has been extended to dissipative systems, relativistic mechanics, and classical field theories.

The Hilbert-space classical mechanics is fruitful in studies on the quantum-classical correspondence as it reveals that the use of Hilbert spaces is not exclusively quantum mechanical. Even Dirac spinors are not exceptionally quantum as they are utilized in the relativistic generalization of Hilbert-space classical mechanics. Similarly as the more well-known phase space formulation of quantum mechanics, Hilbert-space classical mechanics can be understood as an attempt to bring classical and quantum mechanics into a common mathematical framework. In fact, the time evolution of the Wigner function approaches, in the classical limit, the time evolution of the classical wavefunction of a classical particle. However, a mathematical resemblance to quantum mechanics does not imply the presence of hallmark quantum effects. In particular, impossibility of double-slit experiment and Aharonov–Bohm effect are explicitly demonstrated in Hilbert-space classical mechanics.

Classical Hilbert-space propagation vs Wigner propagation
The time evolution of the classical wave function for the Morse potential: $U (x) = 20 ( 1 - e^{-0.16x} )^2$. Black dots are classical particles following Newton's law of motion. The solid lines represent the level set of the Hamiltonian $H(x,p) = p^2 / 2 + U(x)$. This video illustrates the fundamental difference between Hilbert-space classical mechanics and Liouville mechanics.

Quantum counterpart of the classical propagation on the left: The Wigner function time evolution of the Morse potential in atomic units (a.u.). The solid lines represent the level set of the underlying Hamiltonian. Note that the same initial condition used for this quantum propagation as well as for classical propagation on the left.

== See also ==
- Classical mechanics
- Statistical mechanics
- Liouville's theorem
- Quantum mechanics
- Phase space formulation of quantum mechanics
- Wigner quasiprobability distribution
- Dynamical systems
- Ergodic theory
