= Dominicus de Clavasio =

European scholar

Dominicus de Clavasio (fl. 1340–1357) was an Italian-origin scholar who taught in Paris and is known mainly from his book Practica geometriae (1346) which included commentaries on other works of the period. He is referred to variously as Dominicus de Calvisio, Dominicus de Clavaxio, Dominicus de Clivaxo, or Dominique de Chivasso.

De Clavasio's birth date is unknown but he was born in Chivasso near Turin and taught in Paris during 1349–1350 at the Collège de Constantinople. He wrote Practica geometriae (1346) which is made of three parts with Book I being a commentary on contemporary measurement, arithmetic and geometry; Book II on geometrical constructions and III on three-dimensional figures. He extensively commented on Aristotle's works, cited Ptolemy, and Campanus of Novara. The work went into several manuscript versions. He may have died while serving as court astrologer to King John II.
