= Bernard Koopman =

American mathematician

- Born: January 19, 1900; 7th arrondissement of Paris, France
- Died: August 18, 1981 (aged 81); Randolph, New Hampshire, US
- Education: Harvard University
- Known for: Koopman–von Neumann classical mechanics Koopman operator Pitman–Koopman–Darmois theorem
- Scientific career
- Fields: Mathematics
- Workplaces: Columbia University
- Doctoral advisor: G. D. Birkhoff
- Doctoral students: Francis J. Murray

Bernard Osgood Koopman (January 19, 1900 – August 18, 1981) was an American mathematician, known for his work in ergodic theory, the foundations of probability, statistical theory and operations research.

== Education and work ==
After living in France and Italy, Koopman emigrated to the United States in 1915. Koopman was a student of George David Birkhoff and his initial work concentrated on dynamical systems and mathematical physics.

In 1931/1932, Koopman and John von Neumann proposed a Hilbert space formulation of classical mechanics, known as the Koopman–von Neumann classical mechanics.

During World War II, he joined the Anti-Submarine Warfare Operations Research Group (ASWORG, later ORG) in Washington, D.C., directed by Philip M. Morse, to work for the U.S. Navy. The work of Koopman and his colleagues at ASWORG concerned the development of techniques for the US Navy to hunt U-boats. The theoretical work laid the foundations for Bayesian search theory which subsequently became a field of its own within operations research. Their results remained classified Confidential for many years after the war; after 1955 Koopman set out to publish three articles on easily declassifiable portions of the work in the Journal of the Operations Research Society of America. He wrote down the results in detailed form in the book Search and Screening which was declassified in 1958. A large part of his work is a systematization of the work performed by his group at ASWORG; the portions on optimum allocation of search effort and on probabilistic aspects of search theory were developed by Koopman himself.

The Pitman–Koopman–Darmois theorem states that the only families of probability distributions that admit a sufficient statistic whose dimension remains bounded as the sample size increases are exponential families.

== Family ==
Koopman had two daughters from his first wife Mary Louise Harvey who died in 1946. In 1948 he married Jane Bridgman, daughter of his Harvard professor of thermodynamics, Percy Williams Bridgman, and they had three more daughters.

Koopman's mother, née Louise Osgood, was a first cousin of William Fogg Osgood, and his father, Augustus Koopman (1869-1914), was a well known painter.

== Publications ==
- Koopman, B. O. (1931). "Hamiltonian Systems and Transformations in Hilbert Space". Proceedings of the National Academy of Sciences. 17 (5): 315–318. Bibcode:1931PNAS...17..315K. doi:10.1073/pnas.17.5.315. PMC 1076052. PMID 16577368.
- Koopman, B. O. (1936). "On distributions admitting a sufficient statistic". Transactions of the American Mathematical Society. 39 (3): 399–409. doi:10.1090/S0002-9947-1936-1501854-3. This is the paper in which the Pitman–Koopman theorem, sometimes called the Pitman–Koopman–Darmois theorem, appeared.
- "The axioms and algebra of intuitive probability", Annals of Mathematics 41, 269–292, 1940.
- "The bases of probability", Bulletin of the American Mathematical Society, 46, 763–774, 1940.
- "Intuitive probabilities and sequences", Annals of Mathematics 42, 169–187, 1941.
- Search and Screening, first edition 1946 (classified Confidential, declassified in 1958).
