= Hadamard's dynamical system =

Chaotic dynamical system, a type of "billiards"

In physics and mathematics, the Hadamard dynamical system (also called Hadamard's billiard or the Hadamard–Gutzwiller model) is a chaotic dynamical system, a type of dynamical billiards. Introduced by Jacques Hadamard in 1898, and studied by Martin Gutzwiller in the 1980s,

The system considers the motion of a free (frictionless) particle on a surface with constant negative curvature.

== History ==
It is probably the first dynamical system to be proven chaotic , essentially proving that it bounces back and forward between multiple limit points in some shape of ergodic manner

Hadamard was able to show that every particle trajectory moves away from every other in an unstable and hyperbolic fashion, with a geometrical argument about the angles in between trajectories. In modern terminology this means that that the system is always unstable, what is more important is that all trajectories have a positive Lyapunov exponent and therefore chaotic behaviour. Hadamard had the intuition of chaos, but did not explicitly used the Lyapunov exponents or ergodic theory.

Frank Steiner argues that Hadamard's study should be considered to be the first-ever examination of a chaotic dynamical system, and that Hadamard should be considered the first discoverer of chaos. He points out that the study was widely disseminated, and considers the impact of the ideas on the thinking of Albert Einstein and Ernst Mach.

The system is particularly important in that in 1963, Yakov Sinai, in studying Sinai's billiards as a model of the classical ensemble of a Boltzmann–Gibbs gas, was able to show that the motion of the atoms in the gas follow the trajectories in the Hadamard dynamical system.

== Exposition ==
The motion studied is that of a free particle sliding frictionlessly on the surface, namely, one having the Hamiltonian

$$H(p,q)=\frac{1}{2m} p_i p_j g^{ij}(q)$$

where m is the mass of the particle, $q^i$, $i=1,2$ are the coordinates on the manifold, $p_i$ are the conjugate momenta:

$$p_i=mg_{ij} \frac{dq^j}{dt}$$

and

$$ds^2 = g_{ij}(q) dq^i dq^j\,$$

is the metric tensor on the manifold. Because this is the free-particle Hamiltonian, the solution to the Hamilton–Jacobi equations of motion are simply given by the geodesics on the manifold.

Hadamard was able to show that all geodesics are unstable. All geodesics diverge exponentially from one another, as $e^{\lambda t}$ with positive Lyapunov exponent

$$\lambda = \sqrt{\frac{2E}{mR^2}}$$

with E the energy of a trajectory, and $K=-1/R^2$ being the constant negative curvature of the surface.

== Surfaces with negative curvature ==
The Bolza surface, can be such an example of constant negative curvature, i.e., a two-dimensional surface of genus two (a donut with two holes) and constant negative curvature; this is a compact Riemann surface.
