= Theory of impetus =

Theory on projectile motion

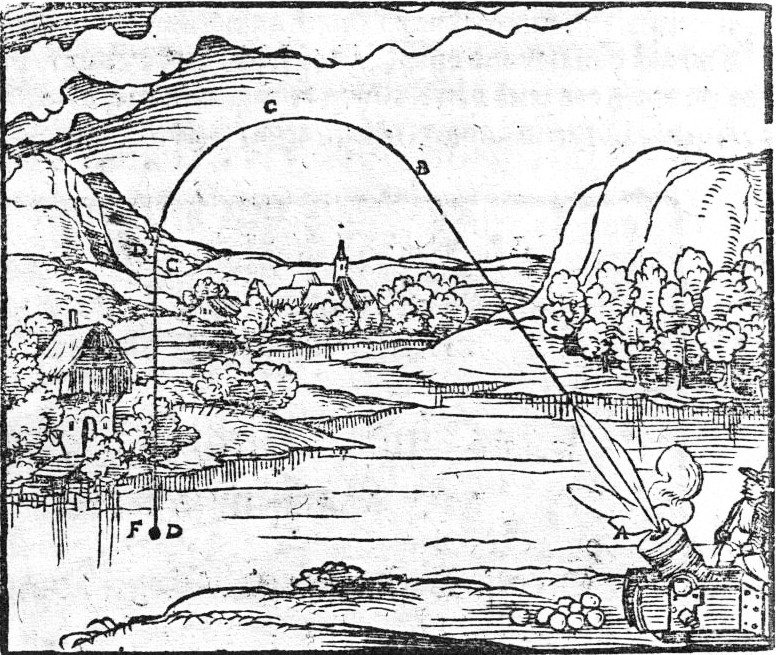
1582 woodcut of artillery, by Walther Hermann Ryff

The theory of impetus, developed in the Middle Ages, attempts to explain the forced motion of a body, what it is, and how it comes about or ceases. In ancient and medieval times, motion was always considered absolute, relative to the Earth as the center of the universe. The theory was introduced by John Philoponus in the 6th century, expanded upon by Islamic scholars in the 11th and 12th centuries, and established in Western scientific thought in the 14th century, before ultimately being disproven in the 17th century. It is the intellectual precursor to the concepts of inertia, momentum and acceleration in classical mechanics.

Franco, Abel B. “Avempace, Projectile Motion, and Impetus Theory.” Journal of the History of Ideas, vol. 64, no. 4, 2003, pp. 521–46. JSTOR, https://doi.org/10.2307/3654219. Accessed 12 Nov. 2026.

The theory of impetus is an auxiliary or secondary theory of Aristotelian dynamics, put forth initially to explain projectile motion against gravity. Aristotelian dynamics of forced (in antiquity called "unnatural") motion states that a body only moves when an external force is constantly driving it. The greater the force acting, the proportionally greater the speed of the body. If the force stops acting, the body immediately returns to the natural state of rest. It also states – as clearly formulated by John of Jadun in his work Quaestiones super 8 libros Physicorum Aristotelis – that both motion and force are transmitted to the medium, such that this force propagates continuously from layer to layer of air, becoming weaker and weaker until it finally dies out. This is how the body finally comes to rest.

Although the medieval philosophers held to the intuitive idea that only a direct application of force could cause and maintain motion, they recognized that Aristotle's explanation of unnatural motion could not be correct. They therefore developed the concept of impetus. Impetus was understood to be a force inherent in a moving body that had previously been transferred to it by an external force during a previous direct contact.

Impetus as a force has no equivalence in modern mechanics, which provides a different explanation of objects in motion: Motion is not absolute but relative to a reference frame (observer), and the permanent state of an object is not rest but uniform motion. The continuity of motion does not require an external or internal force, being based on the inertia of the object. At most, impetus approaches the meaning of "linear momentum" of a mass, because it is linear momentum as the product of mass and velocity that maintains motion due to the inertia of the mass (conservation of linear momentum). But momentum is not a force; rather, a force is the cause of a change in the momentum of a body, and vice versa.

== Aristotelian theory ==
Aristotelian physics is the form of natural philosophy described in the works of the Greek philosopher Aristotle (384–322 BC). In his work Physics, Aristotle intended to establish general principles of change that govern all natural bodies, both living and inanimate, celestial and terrestrial – including all motion, quantitative change, qualitative change, and substantial change.

Aristotle describes two kinds of motion: "violent" or "unnatural motion", such as that of a thrown stone, in Physics (254b10), and "natural motion", such as of a falling object, in On the Heavens (300a20). In violent motion, as soon as the agent stops causing it, the motion stops also: in other words, the natural state of an object is to be at rest. (Aristotle did not address friction.)

== Hipparchus' theory ==
In the 2nd century, Hipparchus assumed that the throwing force is transferred to the body at the time of the throw, and that the body dissipates it during the subsequent up-and-down motion of free fall. This is according to the Neoplatonist Simplicius of Cilicia, who quotes Hipparchus in his book Aristotelis De Caelo commentaria 264, 25 as follows: "Hipparchus says in his book On Bodies Carried Down by Their Weight that the throwing force is the cause of the upward motion of [a lump of] earth thrown upward as long as this force is stronger than that of the thrown body; the stronger the throwing force, the faster the upward motion. Then, when the force decreases, the upward motion continues at a decreased speed until the body begins to move downward under the influence of its own weight, while the throwing force still continues in some way. As this decreases, the velocity of the fall increases and reaches its highest value when this force is completely dissipated." Thus, Hipparchus does not speak of a continuous contact between the moving force and the moving body, or of the function of air as an intermediate carrier of motion, as Aristotle claims.

== Philoponan theory ==
In the 6th century, John Philoponus partly accepted Aristotle's theory that "continuation of motion depends on continued action of a force," but modified it to include his idea that the hurled body acquires a motive power or inclination for forced movement from the agent producing the initial motion and that this power secures the continuation of such motion. However, he argued that this impressed virtue was temporary: that it was a self-expending inclination, and thus the violent motion produced comes to an end, changing back into natural motion.

In his book On Aristotle Physics 641, 12; 641, 29; 642, 9 Philoponus first argues explicitly against Aristotle's explanation that a thrown stone, after leaving the hand, cannot be propelled any further by the air behind it. Then he continues: "Instead, some immaterial kinetic force must be imparted to the projectile by the thrower." He also held that an object thrown into empty space would continue moving without any air to push it, contrary to Aristotle's opinion. Philoponus uses two different expressions for impetus: kinetic capacity (dynamis) and kinetic force (energeia). Both expressions designate a concept similar to the modern concept of energy, distinct from the Aristotelian conceptions of potentiality and actuality.

Philoponus' theory of imparted force cannot be understood as a principle of inertia. For while he rightly says that the driving quality is no longer imparted externally but has become an internal property of the body, he still accepts the Aristotelian assertion that the driving quality is a force (power) that now acts internally and to which velocity is proportional.

== Ockham's theory and Marchia's theory ==
The first to describe persistent motion by itself was William of Ockham in 1318. He proposed a thought experiment in which two projectiles moving in different directions meet at a point; according to Aristotle, the same portion of air at that point would be moved simultaneously in two different directions. Ockham thought this absurd and that it invalidated the Aristotelian theory. "I say therefore that that which moves (ipsum movens) ... after the separation of the moving body from the original projector, is the body moved by itself (ipsum motum secundum se) and not by any power in it or relative to it (virtus absoluta in eo vel respectiva)".

Around 1320, Francis de Marchia developed a detailed and elaborate theory of his virtus derelicta. He described this as force impressed on a projectile that gradually passes away and is consumed by the movement it generates. It is a form that is "not simply permanent, nor simply fluent, but almost medial", staying for some time in the body, but then fading away.

== Iranian theories ==
In the 11th century, Avicenna (Ibn Sīnā) discussed Philoponus' theory in The Book of Healing, in Physics IV.14 he says: "When we independently verify the issue (of projectile motion), we find the most correct doctrine is the doctrine of those who think that the moved object acquires an inclination from the mover."

Ibn Sīnā agreed that an impetus is imparted to a projectile by the thrower and viewed this as persistent, requiring external forces such as air resistance to dissipate it. Ibn Sīnā made distinction between 'force' and 'inclination' (called "mayl"), and argued that an object gained inclination when the object is in opposition to its natural motion. Therefore, he concluded that continuation of motion is attributed to the inclination that is transferred to the object, and that object will be in motion until the inclination is spent. He also claimed that a projectile in a vacuum would not stop unless it is acted upon.

This idea was later described as "impetus" by Jean Buridan, who may have been influenced by Ibn Sina.

== Arabic theories ==
In the 12th century, Hibat Allah Abu'l-Barakat al-Baghdaadi adopted Philoponus' theory of impetus. In his Kitab al-Mu'tabar, Abu'l-Barakat stated that the mover imparts a violent inclination (mayl qasri) on the moved and that this diminishes as the moving object distances itself from the mover. Like Philoponus, and unlike Ibn Sīnā, al-Baghdaadi believed that the inclination self-extinguishes.

He also proposed an explanation of the acceleration of falling bodies where inclination is successively applied, because it is the falling body itself which provides the inclination, as opposed to shooting a bow, where only one violent inclination is applied. According to Shlomo Pines, al-Baghdaadi's theory was:

the oldest negation of Aristotle's fundamental dynamic law [namely, that a constant force produces a uniform motion], [and is thus an] anticipation in a vague fashion of the fundamental law of classical mechanics [namely, that a force applied continuously produces acceleration].

Jean Buridan and Albert of Saxony later refer to Abu'l-Barakat in explaining that the acceleration of a falling body is a result of its increasing impetus.

== Buridanist impetus ==
In the 14th century, Jean Buridan postulated the notion of motive force, which he called impetus.

When a mover sets a body in motion he implants into it a certain impetus, that is, a certain force enabling a body to move in the direction in which the mover starts it ... The implanted impetus increases in the same ratio as the velocity. It is because of this impetus that a stone moves on after the thrower has ceased moving it. But because of the resistance of the air (and also because of the gravity of the stone) which strives to move it in the opposite direction to the motion caused by the impetus, the latter will weaken all the time. Therefore the motion of the stone will be gradually slower, and finally the impetus is so diminished or destroyed that the gravity of the stone prevails and moves the stone towards its natural place. In my opinion one can accept this explanation because the other explanations prove to be false whereas all phenomena agree with this one.

Buridan gives his theory a mathematical value: impetus = weight × velocity.

Buridan's pupil Dominicus de Clavasio in his 1357 De Caelo, states:

When something moves a stone by violence, in addition to imposing on it an actual force, it impresses in it a certain impetus. In the same way gravity not only gives motion itself to a moving body, but also gives it a motive power and an impetus

Buridan's position was that a moving object would only be arrested by the resistance of the air and the weight of the body which would oppose its impetus. Buridan also maintained that impetus was proportional to speed; thus, his initial idea of impetus was similar in many ways to the modern concept of momentum. Buridan saw his theory as only a modification to Aristotle's basic philosophy, maintaining many other peripatetic views, including the belief that there was still a fundamental difference between an object in motion and an object at rest. Buridan also maintained that impetus could be angular in nature, causing objects (such as celestial bodies) to move in a circle.

Buridan pointed out that neither Aristotle's unmoved movers nor Plato's souls are in the Bible, so he applied impetus theory to the eternal rotation of the celestial spheres by extension of a terrestrial example of its application to rotary motion in the form of a rotating millwheel that continues rotating after the propelling hand is withdrawn. (Note: According to Buridan's theory impetus acts in the same direction or manner in which it was created, and thus a circularly or rotationally created impetus acts circularly thereafter.) On the celestial impetus of the spheres he wrote:

God, when He created the world, moved each of the celestial orbs as He pleased, and in moving them he impressed in them impetuses which moved them without his having to move them any more ... And those impetuses which he impressed in the celestial bodies were not decreased or corrupted afterwards, because there was no inclination of the celestial bodies for other movements. Nor was there resistance which would be corruptive or repressive of that impetus.

However, by discounting the possibility of any resistance either due to a contrary inclination to move in any opposite direction or due to any external resistance, he concluded their impetus was therefore not corrupted by any resistance.

This raised the question of why the motive force of impetus does not therefore move the spheres with infinite speed. One answer seemed to be that it was a secondary kind of motive force (Note: The distinction between primary motive forces and secondary motive forces such as impetus was expressed by Oresme, for example, in his De Caelo Bk2 Qu13, which said of impetus, "it is a certain quality of the second species...; it is generated by the motor by means of motion,.." [See p. 552 Clagett 1959]. And in 1494 Thomas Bricot of Paris also spoke of impetus as a second quality, and as an instrument which begins motion under the influence of a principal particular agent but which continues it alone. [See p. 639 Clagett 1959].) that produced uniform motion rather than infinite speed, rather than producing uniformly accelerated motion like the primary force did by producing constantly increasing amounts of impetus. However, in his Treatise on the heavens and the world in which the heavens are moved by inanimate inherent mechanical forces, Buridan's pupil Oresme offered an alternative Thomist inertial response to this problem. His response was to posit a resistance to motion inherent in the heavens (i.e. in the spheres), but which is only a resistance to acceleration beyond their natural speed, rather than to motion itself, and was thus a tendency to preserve their natural speed.

Buridan's theory was further developed by his pupil Albert of Saxony (1316–1390), by writers in Poland such as John Cantius, and the Oxford Calculators. Their work in turn was elaborated by Nicole Oresme who pioneered the practice of demonstrating laws of motion in the form of graphs.

=== The tunnel experiment and oscillatory motion ===
The Buridan impetus theory developed one of the most important thought experiments in the history of science, the 'tunnel-experiment'. This experiment incorporated oscillatory and pendulum motion into dynamical analysis and the science of motion. It also established one of the important principles of classical mechanics. The tunnel experiment also gave rise to the more generally important axiomatic principle of Galilean, Huygenian and Leibnizian dynamics, namely that a body rises to the same height from which it has fallen, a principle of gravitational potential energy. As Galileo Galilei expressed this fundamental principle of his dynamics in his 1632 Dialogo: "The heavy falling body acquires sufficient impetus [in falling from a given height] to carry it back to an equal height."

This imaginary experiment postulated that a cannonball dropped into a tunnel going straight through the Earth's centre and out the other side would pass the centre and rise on the opposite side to the same height from which it had first fallen. It explained that this would be due to the gravitationally created impetus accumulated in the ball's descent being destroyed by gravity operating in the opposite direction once it passed the centre. The ball would then oscillate back and forth from one end of the tunnel to the other, indefinitely. The tunnel experiment provided the first dynamic model of oscillatory motion, specifically in terms of A–B impetus dynamics.

The experiment has been applied to the dynamic explanation of oscillatory motion in a pendulum. In this, the motion of the cannonball is likened to that of a pendulum bob imagined to be attached to the end of an immensely long cord suspended from the vault of the fixed stars. The relatively short arc of its path through the Earth is essentially a straight line along the tunnel. Actual pendula could be seen as tiny versions of this tunnel pendulum: they oscillate above the Earth's surface in arcs corresponding to the tunnel, as their oscillatory midpoint was dynamically assimilated to the tunnel's centre.

The tunnel experiment has also been applied to the oscillatory motion of vibrating string in a musical instrument. In such cases, gravitational force is replaced by tension pulling the string toward its normal (i.e.: resting state). When plucked and released, the string vibrated in a continual cycle of the alternating creation of impetus toward the normal and its destruction after passing through the normal.

The tunnel experiment was a crucial experiment in favour of impetus dynamics. It invalidated theories of Aristotelian dynamics, which suggested that a pendulum bob would stop at its normal resting point at the bottom of its swing. It constituted a crucial experiment between alternative theories of natural motion. The experiment's explanation of oscillating motion is held as one of the greatest imaginative developments of medieval Aristotelian dynamics.

Shortly before Galileo's theory of impetus, Giambattista Benedetti modified the growing theory of impetus to involve linear motion alone: "[Any] portion of corporeal matter which moves by itself when an impetus has been impressed on it by any external motive force has a natural tendency to move on a rectilinear, not a curved, path." Benedetti cites the motion of a rock in a sling as an example of the inherent linear motion of objects, forced into circular motion.

== See also ==
- Conatus
- Physics in the medieval Islamic world
- History of science

== Bibliography ==
- Clagett, Marshall (1959). Science of Mechanics in the Middle Ages. University of Wisconsin Press.
- Crombie, Alistair Cameron (1959). The History of Science From Augustine to Galileo. Dover Publications. ISBN 9780486288505.
- Duhem, Pierre. [1906–13]: Etudes sur Leonard de Vinci
- Duhem, Pierre, History of Physics, Section IX, XVI and XVII in The Catholic Encyclopedia
- Drake, Stillman; Drabkin, I. E. (1969). Mechanics in Sixteenth Century Italy. University of Wisconsin Press. ISBN 9781101203736.
- Galilei, Galileo (1590). De Motu. translated in On Motion and on Mechanics. Drabkin & Drake.
- Galilei, Galileo (1953). Dialogo. Translated by Stillman Drake. University of California Press.
- Galilei, Galileo (1974). Discorsi. Translated by Stillman Drake.
- Grant, Edward (1996). The Foundations of Modern Science in the Middle Ages. Cambridge University Press. ISBN 0-521-56137-X.
- Hentschel, Klaus (2009). "Zur Begriffs- und Problemgeschichte von 'Impetus'". In Yousefi, Hamid Reza; Dick, Christiane (eds.). Das Wagnis des Neuen. Kontexte und Restriktionen der Wissenschaft. Nordhausen: Bautz. pp. 479–499. ISBN 978-3-88309-507-3.
- Koyré, Alexandre. Galilean Studies.
- Kuhn, Thomas (1957). The Copernican Revolution.
- Kuhn, Thomas (1970) [1962]. The Structure of Scientific Revolutions.
- Moody, E. A. (1966). "Galileo and his precursors". In Golino (ed.). Galileo Reappraised. University of California Press.
- Moody, E. A. (1951). "Galileo and Avempace: The Dynamics of the Leaning Tower Experiment". Journal of the History of Ideas. 12 (2): 163–193. doi:10.2307/2707514. JSTOR 2707514.
