= Science in the Renaissance =

Science in the Renaissance was predominantly an extension of medieval traditions of natural philosophy but also included a radical revolution in the European understanding of the Earth's geography and produced new ideas and methods in anatomy, mathematics, and astronomy. The collection of ancient scientific texts began in earnest at the start of the 15th century and continued up to the Fall of Constantinople in 1453, and the invention of printing allowed a faster propagation of new ideas. Some scholars have argued that the era was scientifically backward because Renaissance humanists were excessively deferential to ancient authorities or because they favored human-centered subjects like politics and history over study of natural philosophy or applied mathematics. More recently, however, scholars have acknowledged the positive impact of the rediscovery of lost or obscure texts and the increased focus on the study of language and the correct reading of texts, while also emphasizing how the invention and rapid spread of the moveable type printing press and the encounter with the Americas served as necessary preconditions for the Scientific Revolution of the 17th century.

== Renaissance humanism ==
Renaissance humanism was a "movement to recover, interpret, and assimilate the language, literature, learning and values of ancient Greece and Rome", which asserted "the genius of man ... the unique and extraordinary ability of the human mind". The scholar, poet and Catholic priest Petrarch's rediscovery of Cicero's letters in the 14th century is often credited with initiating the movement. In Italy, the humanist educational program (whose subjects came to be known as the "humanities") won rapid acceptance, and by the mid-15th century many of the upper classes had received humanist educations. Some of the highest officials of the Catholic Church were humanists (with the resources to amass important libraries), and there were several 15th-century and early-16th-century humanist popes.

The science historian A. Rupert Hall writes that "there are important reservations to be made concerning Renaissance humanism as a force making for innovation in science":

... [I]n their revision of classical authors for the press the scholar scientists were if anything less prone to comment adversely upon them than their medieval predecessors. Among the humanists intense admiration for the work of antiquity led to the belief than human talent and achievement had consistently deteriorated after the golden age of Hellenistic civilization; that the upward ascent demanded imitation of this remote past, rather than an adventure along strange paths ... [H]umanism sometimes made it more difficult to enunciate a new idea, or to criticize the splendid inheritance from antiquity.

Science historian Herbert Butterfield makes a similar point about the deference Renaissance humanists showed to ancient authorities:

A primary aspect of the Renaissance ... is the fact that it completes and brings to its climax the long process by which the thought of antiquity was being recovered in the middle ages. It even carries to what at times is a ludicrous extreme the spirit of an exaggerated subservience to antiquity, the spirit that helped to turn Latin into a dead language. Ideas may have appeared in new combinations, but we cannot say that essentially new ingredients were introduced into our civilization in the Renaissance.

== Important developments ==
=== Printing ===
The spread of printing between 1440 and 1500.

From a single print shop in Mainz, Germany, around 1440, the movable type printing-press had spread to around 270 cities in central, western and eastern Europe and had already produced more than 20 million volumes by the end of the 15th century. Printing made scholarly books much more widely accessible, but most of the initial demand for the new printed books during the Renaissance was for the works of long-dead authors rather than living scholars.

By the late 16th century, however, the manuscript culture of the Middle Ages, where facts were few and far between, had begun to give way to a printing culture where living scholars could compare their own observations with those of other (living) scholars. That shift decisively transformed natural philosophy into a collective and cumulative enterprise where reliable and documented facts rapidly proliferated, creating the intellectual scaffolding for the Scientific Revolution and a secure foundation for new scientific knowledge.

=== Geography and the New World ===
In the history of geography, the key classical text was the Geographia of Claudius Ptolemy (2nd century). It was translated into Latin in the 15th century by Jacopo d'Angelo. It was widely read in manuscript and went through many print editions after it was first printed in 1475. Regiomontanus worked on preparing an edition for print prior to his death; his manuscripts were consulted by later mathematicians in Nuremberg. Ptolemy's Geographia became the basis for most maps made in Europe throughout the 15th century. Even as new knowledge began to replace the content of old maps, the rediscovery of Ptolemy's mapping system, including the use of coordinates and projection, helped to redefine the overall field of cartography as a scientific pursuit rather than an artistic one.

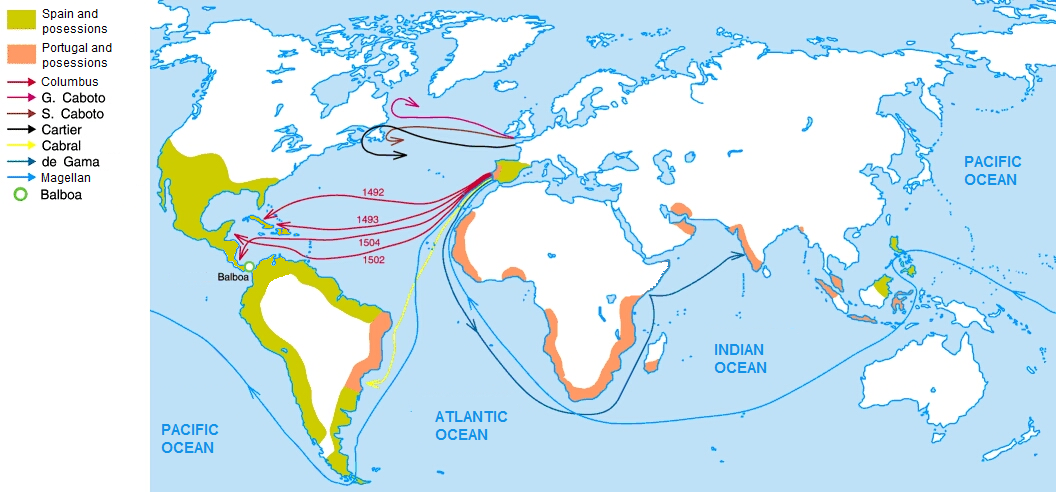
European voyages of the Age of Discovery

The information provided by Ptolemy, as well as Pliny the Elder and other classical sources, was soon seen to be in contradiction to the lands explored in the Age of Discovery. The new discoveries revealed shortcomings in classical knowledge and opened the European imagination to new possibilities. In particular, Christopher Columbus' voyage to the New World in 1492 helped set the tone for what would soon after become a wave of European expansion. Thomas More's Utopia was inspired partly by the discovery of the New World. Most maps developed prior to this period grossly underestimated the extent of the lands separating Europe from India on a westward route through the New World; however, through contributions of explorers such as Ferdinand Magellan, efforts were made to create more accurate maps during this period.

=== Alchemy and chemistry ===
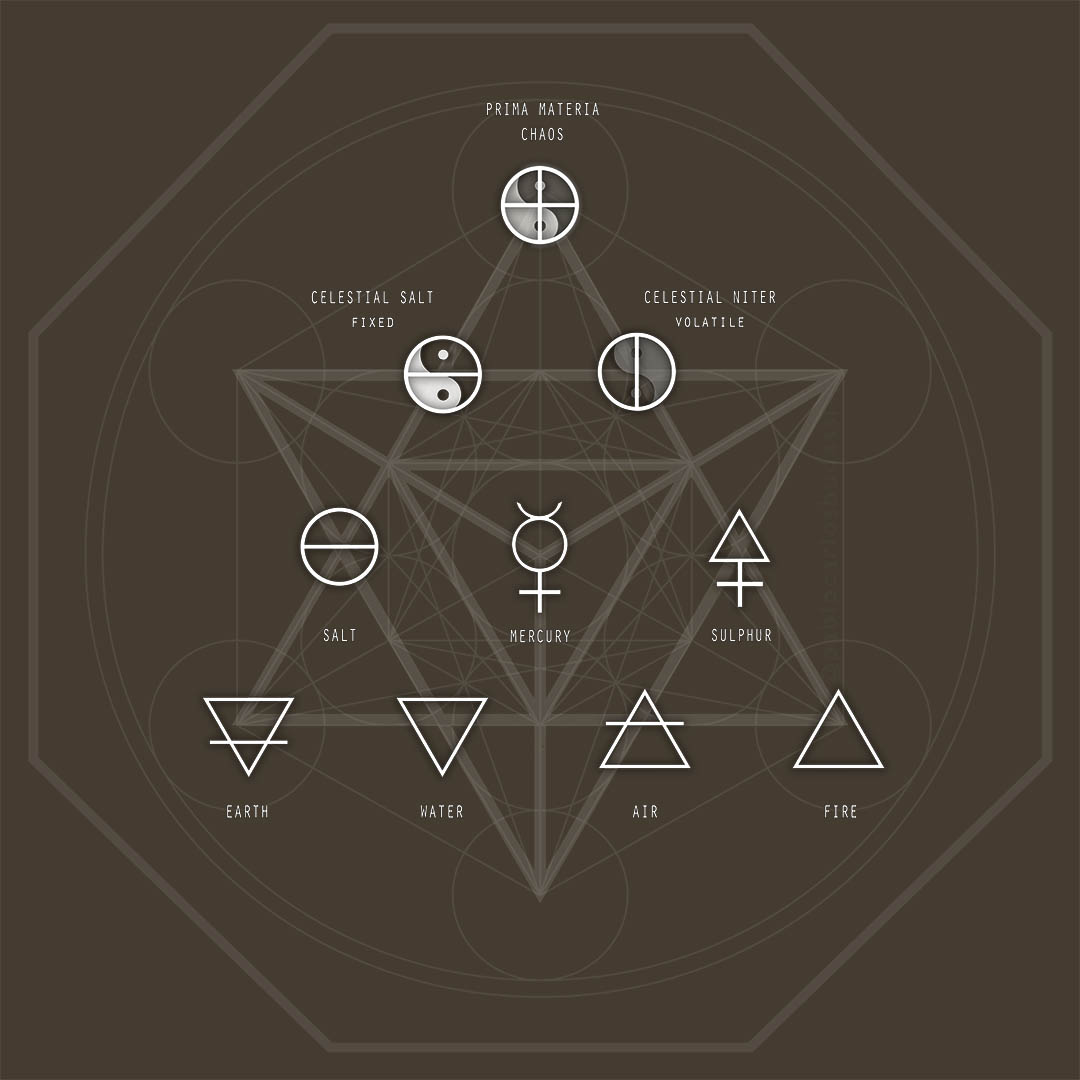
Diagram of Alchemical Elements

While differing in some respects, alchemy and chemistry often had similar goals during the Renaissance period, and together they are sometimes referred to as chymistry. Alchemy is the study of the transmutation of materials through obscure processes. Although it is often viewed as a pseudoscientific endeavor, many of its practitioners utilized widely accepted scientific theories of their times to formulate hypotheses about the constituents of matter and the ways matter could be changed. One of the main aims of alchemists was to find a method of creating gold and other precious metals from the transmutation of base materials. A common belief of alchemists was that there is an essential substance from which all other substances formed, and that if you could reduce a substance to this original material, you could then construct it into another substance, like lead to gold. Medieval alchemists worked with two main elements or "principles", sulphur and mercury.

Paracelsus was a chymist and physician of the Renaissance period who believed that, in addition to sulphur and mercury, salt served as one of the primary alchemical principles from which everything else was made. Paracelsus was also instrumental in helping to put chemical practices to practical medicinal use through a recognition that the body operates through processes which may be seen as chemical in nature. These lines of thinking directly conflicted with many long-held traditional beliefs, such as those popularized by Aristotle; however, Paracelsus was insistent that questioning principles of nature was essential to continue the general growth of knowledge. Hall describes him as a "picturesque ranter" whose "mystical conception of nature [was] entirely alien to that of natural science."

Despite its frequent basis in what may be considered scientific practices by modern standards, numerous factors caused chymistry as a discipline to remain separate from general academia until near the end of the Renaissance, when it finally began appearing as a portion of some university education. The commercial nature of chymistry at the time, along with the lack of classical basis for the practice, were some of the contributing factors which led to the general view of the discipline as a craft rather than a respectable academic discipline.

=== Astronomy ===
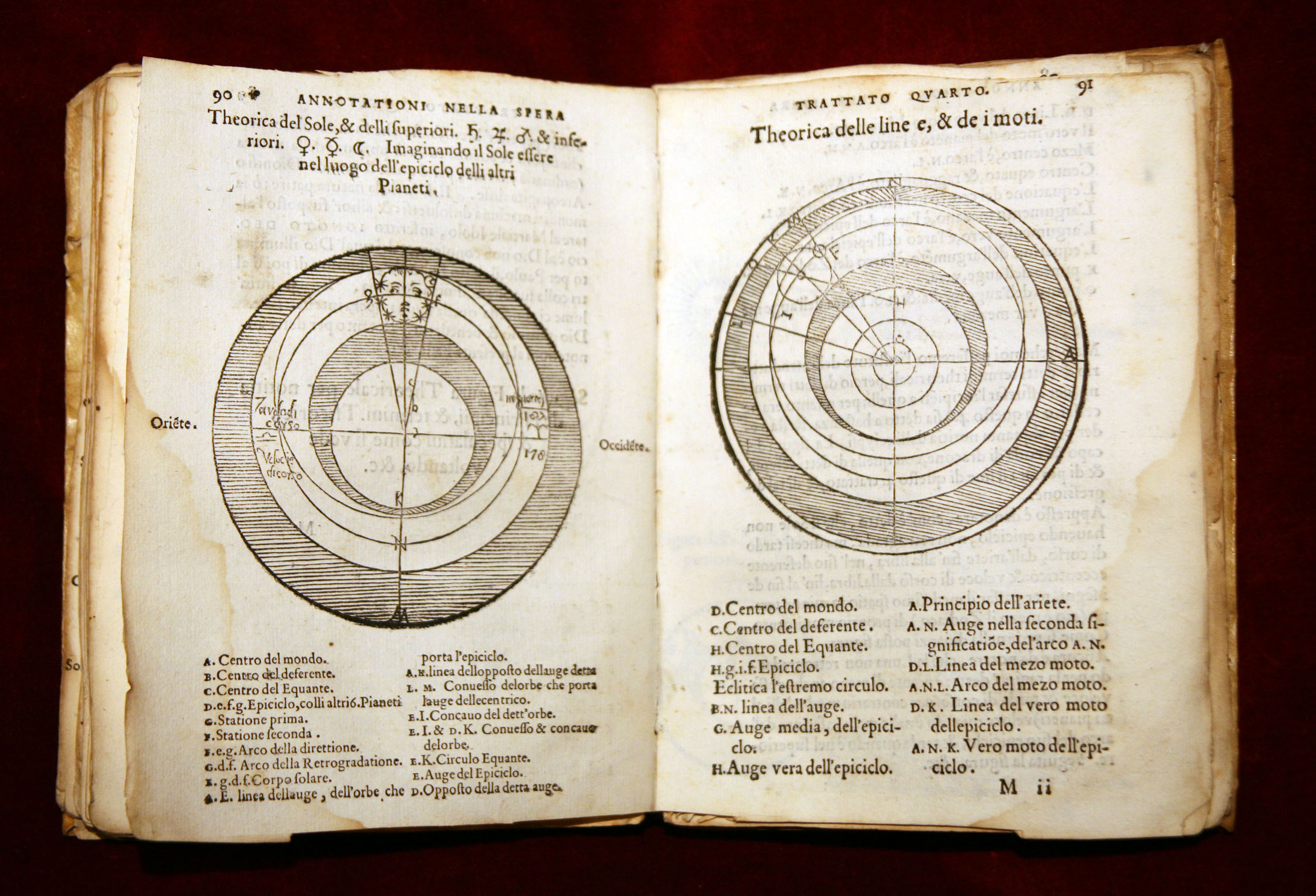
Pages from 1550 Annotazione on Sacrobosco's De sphaera mundi, showing the Ptolemaic system

The astronomy of the late Middle Ages was based on the geocentric model described by Claudius Ptolemy in antiquity. Probably very few practicing astronomers or astrologers actually read Ptolemy's Almagest, which had been translated into Latin by Gerard of Cremona in the 12th century. Instead they relied on introductions to the Ptolemaic system such as the De sphaera mundi of Johannes de Sacrobosco and the genre of textbooks known as Theorica planetarum. For the task of predicting planetary motions they turned to the Alfonsine tables, a set of astronomical tables based on the Almagest models but incorporating some later modifications, mainly the trepidation model attributed to Thabit ibn Qurra. Contrary to popular belief, astronomers of the Middle Ages and Renaissance did not resort to "epicycles on epicycles" in order to correct the original Ptolemaic models—until one comes to Copernicus himself.

Sometime around 1450, mathematician Georg Purbach (1423–1461) began a series of lectures on astronomy at the University of Vienna. Regiomontanus (1436–1476), who was then one of his students, collected his notes on the lecture and later published them as Theoricae novae planetarum in the 1470s. This "New Theorica" replaced the older theorica as the textbook of advanced astronomy. Purbach also began to prepare a summary and commentary on the Almagest. He died after completing only six books, however, and Regiomontanus continued the task, consulting a Greek manuscript brought from Constantinople by Cardinal Bessarion. When it was published in 1496, the Epitome of the Almagest made the highest levels of Ptolemaic astronomy widely accessible to many European astronomers for the first time.

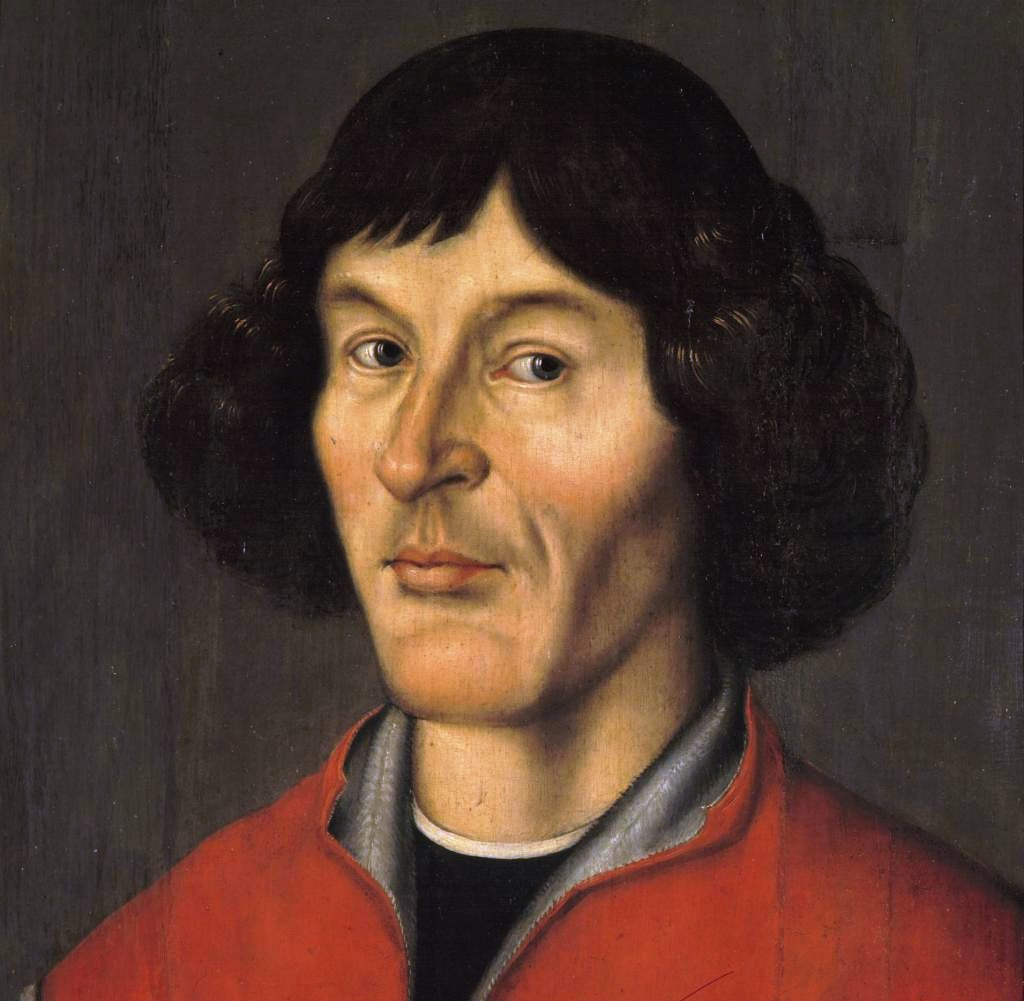
Nicolaus Copernicus

The last major event in Renaissance astronomy was the work of Nicolaus Copernicus (1473–1543). He was among the first generation of astronomers to be trained with the Theoricae novae and the Epitome. Shortly before 1514 he began to revive Aristarchus's idea that the Earth revolves around the Sun. He spent the rest of his life attempting a mathematical proof of heliocentrism. In De revolutionibus orbium coelestium, published in 1543, Copernicus attempted to align his work as closely as possible with Ptolemaic tradition. A comparison of his work with the Almagest shows that he followed Ptolemy's methods and even his order of presentation. Yet, in order to purge astronomy of the equant—which violated the theological and philosophical ideal that all celestial motion must be "perfect" (i.e. circular) and uniform—Copernicus challenged Ptolemy's geocentrism, an orthodoxy that had prevailed for over a millennium. Copernicus' heliostatic model (with a stationary Sun located near, though not precisely at, the mathematical center of the heavens) retained several false Ptolemaic assumptions such as the planets' circular orbits, epicycles, and uniform speeds, but also included such accurate ideas as:

- The Earth is one of several planets revolving around the Sun in a determined order.
- The Earth rotates daily on its axis and revolves annually about the Sun.
- Retrograde motion of the planets is explained by the Earth's motion.
- The distance from the Earth to the Sun is small compared to the distance from the Sun to the stars.

=== Mathematics ===
Archimedes' proofs of the area of a parabolic segment in Quadrature of the Parabola inspired work on quadratures and cubatures in the 15th and 16th centuries.

The accomplishments of Greek mathematicians survived throughout Late Antiquity and the Middle Ages through a long and indirect history. Much of the work of Euclid, Archimedes, and Apollonius, along with later authors such as Hero and Pappus, were copied and studied in both Byzantine culture and in Islamic centers of learning. Translations of these works began already in the 12th century, with the work of translators in Spain and Sicily, working mostly from Arabic and Greek sources into Latin. Two of the most prolific were Gerard of Cremona and William of Moerbeke.

The greatest of all translation efforts, however, took place in the 15th and 16th centuries in Italy, as attested by the numerous manuscripts dating from this period currently found in European libraries. Virtually all leading mathematicians of the era were obsessed with the need for restoring the mathematical works of the ancients. Not only did humanists assist mathematicians with the retrieval of Greek manuscripts, they also took an active role in translating these work into Latin, often commissioned by religious leaders such as Nicholas V and Cardinal Bessarion.

Some of the leading figures in this effort include Regiomontanus, who made a copy of the Latin Archimedes and had a program for printing mathematical works; Commandino (1509–1575), who likewise produced an edition of Archimedes, as well as editions of works by Euclid, Hero, and Pappus; and Maurolyco (1494–1575), who not only translated the work of ancient mathematicians but added much of his own work to these. Their translations ensured that the next generation of mathematicians would be in possession of techniques far in advance of what it was generally available during the Middle Ages.

It must be borne in mind that the mathematical output of the 15th and 16th centuries was not exclusively limited to the works of the ancient Greeks. Some mathematicians, such as Tartaglia and Luca Paccioli, welcomed and expanded on the medieval traditions of both Islamic scholars and people like Jordanus and Fibonnacci. Giordano Bruno was also one to critique the works of people like Aristotle, whom he believed to have a flawed logic and developed a mathematical doctrine for the computation of partial physics, with Bruno attempting to transform theories of nature.

=== Physics ===
The progress being made in mathematics was complemented by advancements in physics, with people attempting to bridge the gap between the two fields and question Aristotelian ideas. The revived investigation of physics opened up many opportunities in subfields like mechanics, optics, navigation, and cartography.

Mechanical theories had originated with the Greeks, especially Aristotle and Archimedes. Mechanics and philosophy had been related disciplines in ancient Greece, and only in the Renaissance did the two subjects begin to split. A lot of the work of developing new mechanical ideas and theories was carried out by Italians such as Rafael Bombelli, though the Fleming Simon Stevin also provided many ideas.

Navigation was an important topic of the time, and many innovations were made that, with the introduction of better ships and applications of the compass, would later lead to geographical discoveries. The calculations involved in navigation proved to be difficult, with the technology of the time unable to accuately predict weather or determine one's geographic position. Determining one's longitude proved especially challenging, since one's local time need to be calculated on the basis of an astronomical observation. One theory that was tested was to record the time of an eclipse and use Regiomontanus' Ephemerides to compare it with Nuremberg time or Zacuto's Almanach perpetuum to compare it with Salamanca time, though the margin of error in such calculations was unacceptably great (around 25.5 degrees). Until longitude could be accurately determined, navigators had to rely on dead reckoning, with its many uncertainties.

=== Medicine ===
With the Renaissance came an increase in experimental investigation, principally in the field of dissection and body examination, thus advancing our knowledge of human anatomy. The development of modern neurology began in the 16th century with Andreas Vesalius, who described the anatomy of the brain and other organs; he had little knowledge of the brain's function, thinking that it resided mainly in the ventricles. Understanding of medical sciences and diagnosis improved, but with little direct benefit to health care. Few effective drugs existed, beyond opium and quinine. William Harvey provided a refined and complete description of the circulatory system. The most useful tomes in medicine, used both by students and expert physicians, were materiae medicae and pharmacopoeiae.

== See also ==
- Continuity thesis
- The Copernican Question
- Renaissance magic
- Renaissance technology
