= European science in the Middle Ages =

Period of history of science

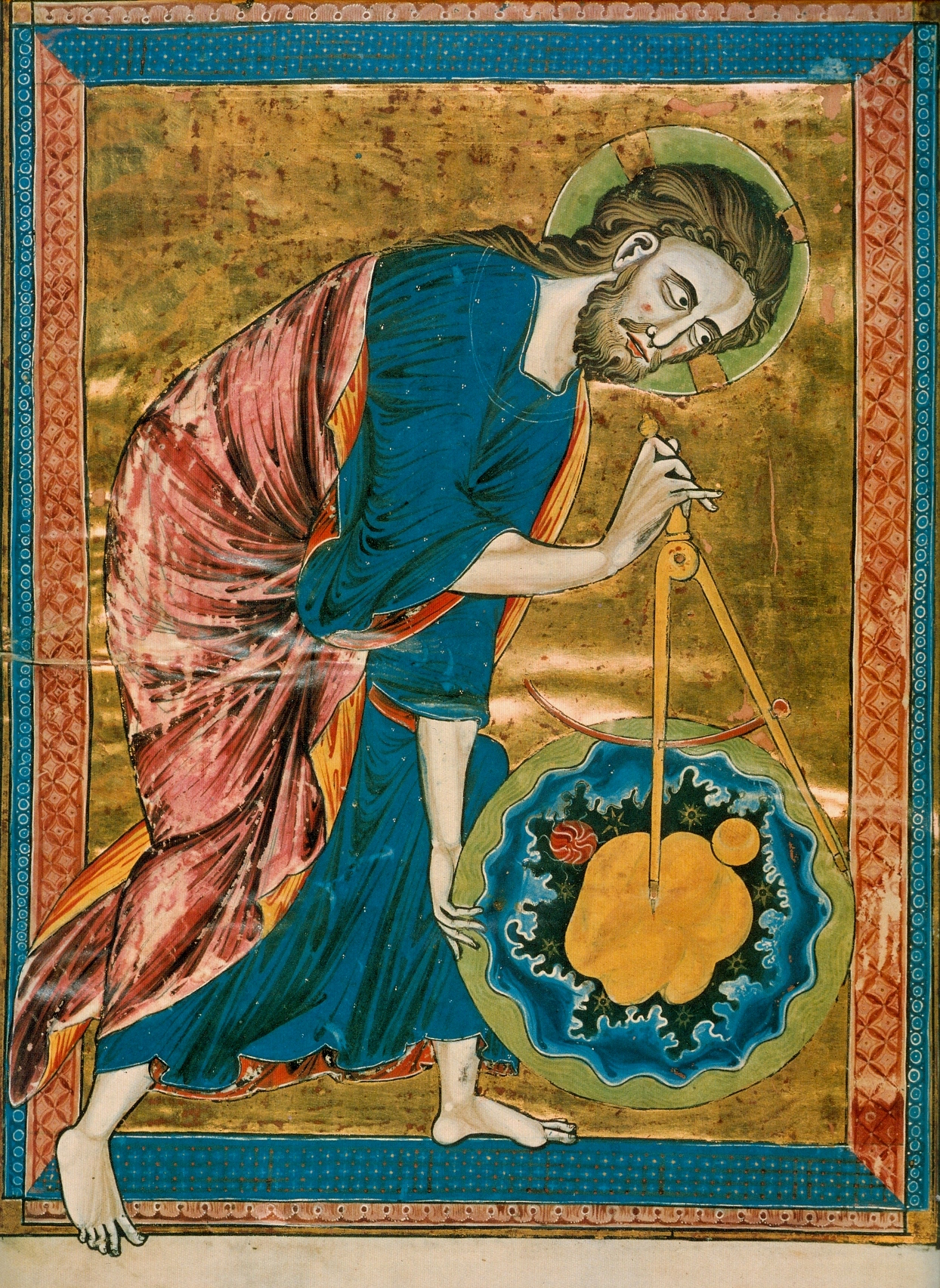
For most medieval scholars, who believed that God created the universe according to geometric and harmonic principles, science – particularly geometry and astronomy – was linked directly to the divine. To seek these principles, therefore, would be to seek God.

European science in the Middle Ages comprised the study of nature, mathematics and natural philosophy in medieval Europe. Following the fall of the Western Roman Empire and the decline in knowledge of Greek, Christian Western Europe was cut off from an important source of ancient learning. Although a range of Christian clerics and scholars from Isidore and Bede to Jean Buridan and Nicole Oresme maintained the spirit of rational inquiry, Western Europe would see a period of scientific decline during the Early Middle Ages. However, by the time of the High Middle Ages, the region had rallied and was on its way to once more taking the lead in scientific discovery. Scholarship and scientific discoveries of the Late Middle Ages laid the groundwork for the Scientific Revolution of the post-medieval period.

According to Pierre Duhem, who founded the academic study of medieval science as a critique of the Enlightenment theory of a 17th-century anti-Aristotelian and anticlerical scientific revolution, the various conceptual origins of that alleged revolution lay in the 12th to 14th centuries, in the works of churchmen such as Thomas Aquinas and Buridan.

In the context of this article, "Western Europe" refers to the European cultures bound together by the Catholic Church and the Latin language.

== Western Europe ==
As Roman imperial power effectively ended in the West during the 5th century, Western Europe entered the Middle Ages with great difficulties that affected the continent's intellectual production dramatically. Most classical scientific treatises of classical antiquity written in Greek were unavailable, leaving only simplified summaries and compilations. Nonetheless, Roman and early medieval scientific texts were read and studied, contributing to the understanding of nature as a coherent system functioning under divinely established laws that could be comprehended in the light of reason. This study continued through the Early Middle Ages, and with the Renaissance of the 12th century, interest in this study was revitalized through the translation of Greek and Arabic scientific texts. Scientific study further developed within the emerging medieval universities, where these texts were studied and elaborated, leading to new insights into the phenomena of the universe. These advances are virtually unknown to the lay public of today, partly because most theories advanced in medieval science are today obsolete, and partly because of the caricature of the Middle Ages as a supposedly "Dark Age" which placed "the word of religious authorities over personal experience and rational activity."

=== Early Middle Ages (AD 476–1000) ===
In the ancient world, Greek had been the primary language of science. Even under the Roman Empire, Latin texts drew extensively on Greek work, some pre-Roman, some contemporary; while advanced scientific research and teaching continued to be carried on in the Hellenistic side of the empire, in Greek. Late Roman attempts to translate Greek writings into Latin had limited success.

As the knowledge of Greek declined during the transition to the Middle Ages, the Latin West found itself cut off from its Greek philosophical and scientific roots. Most scientific inquiry came to be based on information gleaned from sources which were often incomplete and posed serious problems of interpretation. Latin-speakers who wanted to learn about science only had access to books by such Roman writers as Calcidius, Macrobius, Martianus Capella, Boethius, Cassiodorus, and later Latin encyclopedists. Much had to be gleaned from non-scientific sources: Roman surveying manuals were read for what geometry was included.

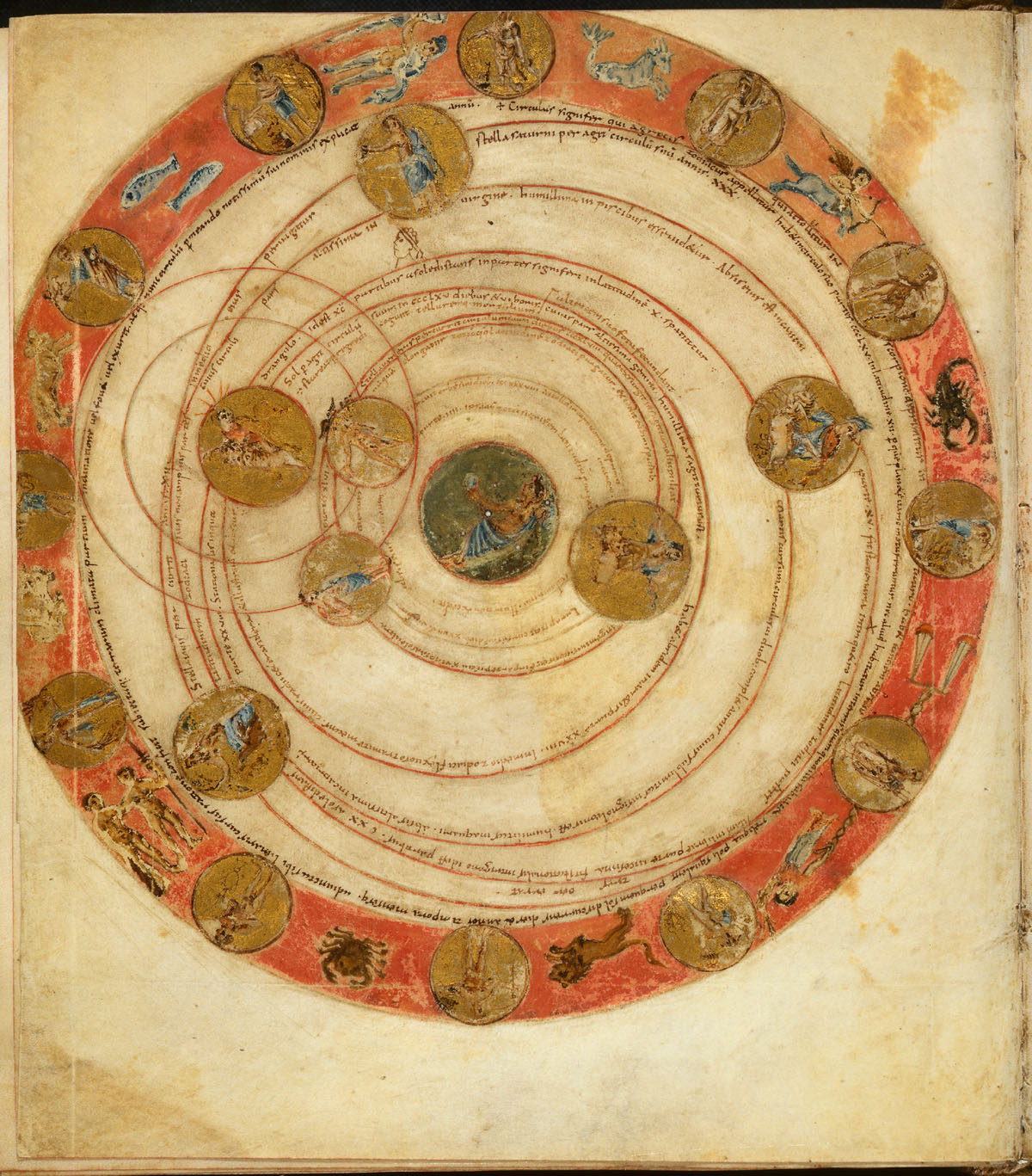
Ninth century diagram of the observed and computed positions of the seven planets on 18 March 816

De-urbanization reduced the scope of education and by the 6th century teaching and learning moved to monastic and cathedral schools, with the center of education being the study of the Bible. Education of the laity survived modestly in Italy, Spain, and the southern part of Gaul, where Roman influences were most long-lasting. In the 7th century, learning began to emerge in Ireland and the Celtic lands, where Latin was a foreign language and Latin texts were eagerly studied and taught.

The leading scholars of the early centuries were clergymen for whom the study of nature was but a small part of their interest. They lived in an atmosphere which provided little institutional support for the disinterested study of natural phenomena. The study of nature was pursued more for practical reasons than as an abstract inquiry: the need to care for the sick led to the study of medicine and of ancient texts on drugs, the need for monks to determine the proper time to pray led them to study the motion of the stars, the need to compute the date of Easter led them to study and teach rudimentary mathematics and the motions of the Sun and Moon. Modern readers may find it disconcerting that sometimes the same works discuss both the technical details of natural phenomena and their symbolic significance.

Around 800, Charles the Great, assisted by the English monk Alcuin of York, undertook what has become known as the Carolingian Renaissance, a program of cultural revitalization and educational reform. The chief scientific aspect of Charlemagne's educational reform concerned the study and teaching of astronomy, both as a practical art that clerics required to compute the date of Easter and as a theoretical discipline. From the year 787 on, decrees were issued recommending the restoration of old schools and the founding of new ones throughout the empire. Institutionally, these new schools were either under the responsibility of a monastery, a cathedral or a noble court.

The scientific work of the period after Charlemagne was not so much concerned with original investigation as it was with the active study and investigation of ancient Roman scientific texts. This investigation paved the way for the later effort of Western scholars to recover and translate ancient Greek texts in philosophy and the sciences.

=== High Middle Ages (AD 1000–1300) ===
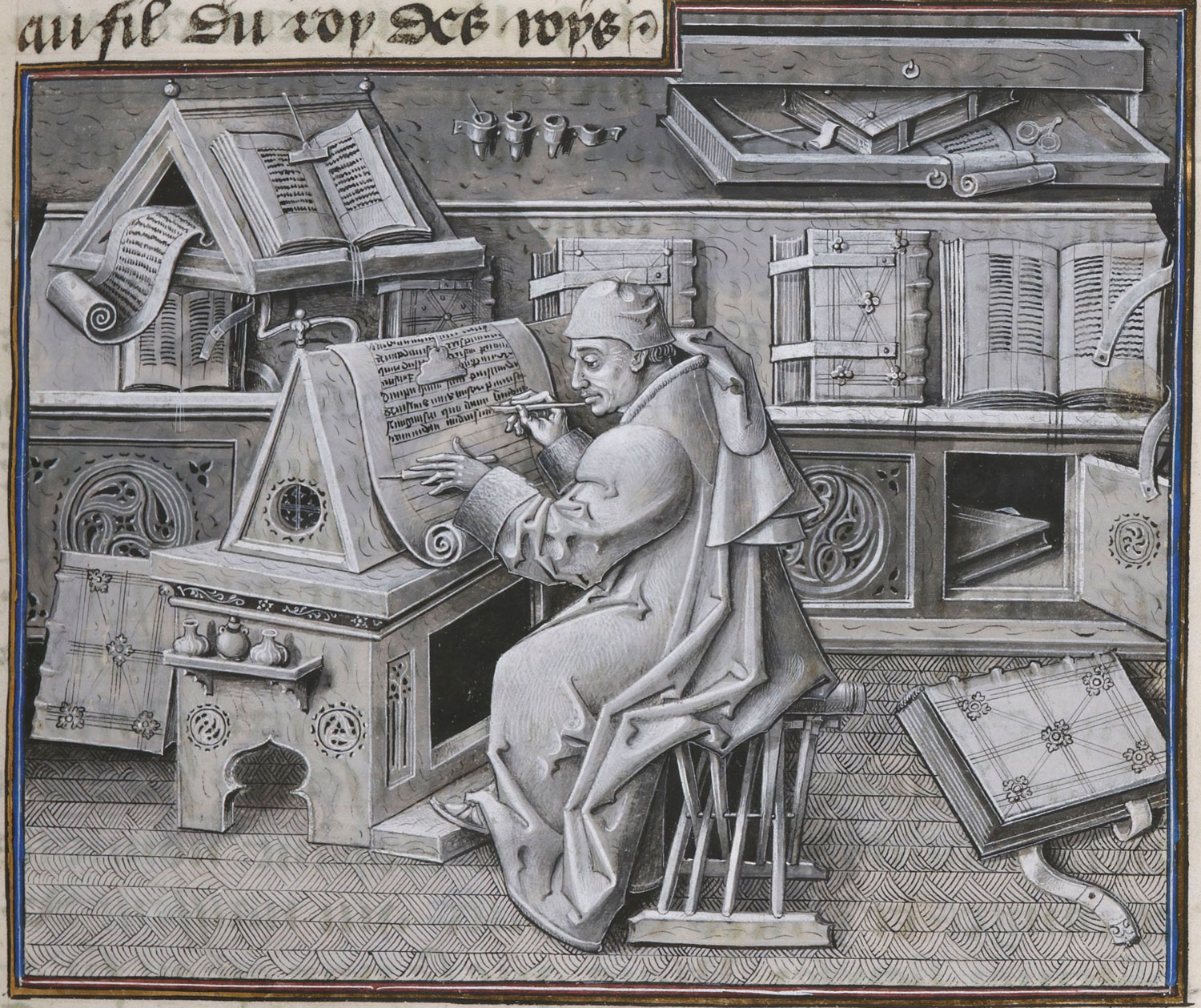
The translation of Greek and Arabic works allowed the full development of Christian philosophy and the method of scholasticism.

Beginning around the year 1050, European scholars built upon their existing knowledge by seeking out ancient learning in Greek and Arabic texts which they translated into Latin. They encountered a wide range of classical Greek texts, some of which had earlier been translated into Arabic, accompanied by commentaries and independent works by Islamic thinkers.

Gerard of Cremona is a good example: an Italian who traveled to Spain to copy a single text, he stayed on to translate some seventy works. His biography describes how he came to Toledo: "He was trained from childhood at centers of philosophical study and had come to a knowledge of all that was known to the Latins; but for love of the Almagest, which he could not find at all among the Latins, he went to Toledo; there, seeing the abundance of books in Arabic on every subject and regretting the poverty of the Latins in these things, he learned the Arabic language, in order to be able to translate."

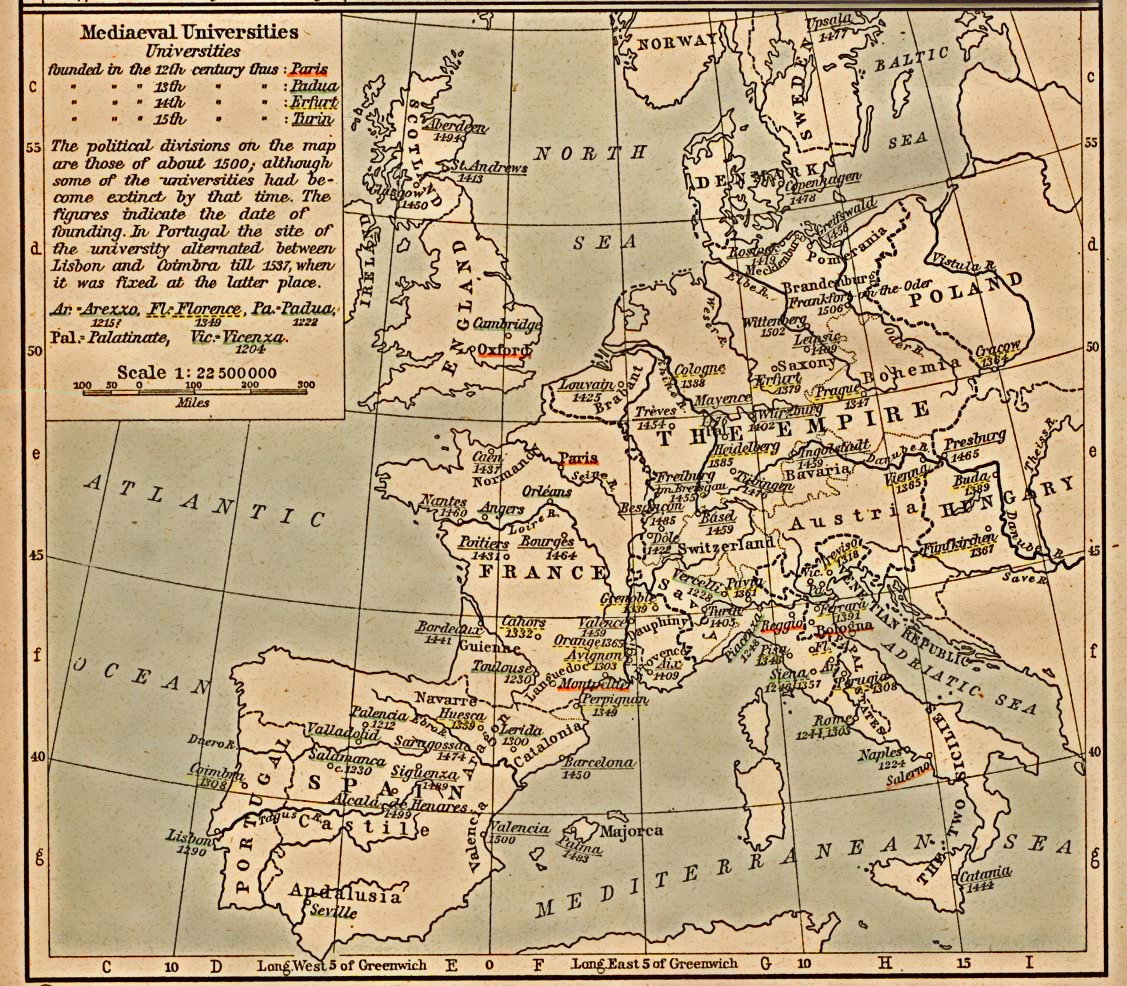
Map of medieval universities. They started a new infrastructure which was needed for scientific communities.

This period also saw the birth of medieval universities, which benefited materially from the translated texts and provided a new infrastructure for scientific communities. Some of these new universities were registered as institutions of international excellence by the Holy Roman Empire, receiving the title of Studium Generale. Most of the early Studia Generali were found in Italy, France, England, and Spain, and these were considered the most prestigious places of learning in Europe. This list quickly grew as new universities were founded throughout Europe. As early as the 13th century, scholars from a Studium Generale were encouraged to give lecture courses at other institutes across Europe and to share documents, and this led to the current academic culture seen in modern European universities.

The rediscovery of the works of Aristotle allowed the full development of the new Christian philosophy and the method of scholasticism. By 1200, there were reasonably accurate Latin translations of the main works of Aristotle, Euclid, Ptolemy, Archimedes, and Galen—that is, of all the intellectually crucial ancient authors except Plato. Also, many of the medieval Arabic and Jewish key texts, such as the main works of Avicenna, Averroes and Maimonides are now available in Latin. During the 13th century, scholastics expanded the natural philosophy of these texts by commentaries (associated with teaching in the universities) and independent treatises. Notable among these were the works of Robert Grosseteste, Roger Bacon, John of Sacrobosco, Albertus Magnus, and Duns Scotus.

Scholastics believed in empiricism and supported Roman Catholic doctrines through secular study, reason, and logic. The most famous was Thomas Aquinas (later declared a "Doctor of the Church"), who led the move away from the Platonic and Augustinian and towards Aristotelianism (although natural philosophy was not his main concern). Meanwhile, precursors of the modern scientific method can be seen already in Grosseteste's emphasis on mathematics as a way to understand nature and in the empirical approach admired by Roger Bacon.

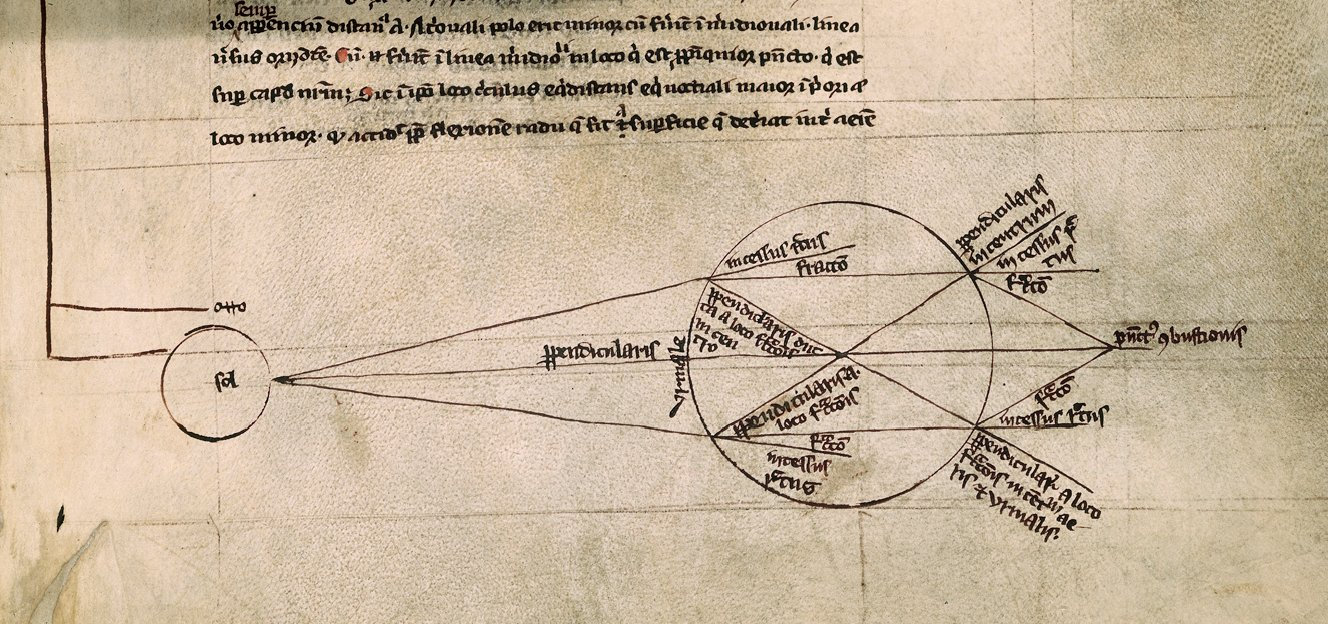
Optical diagram showing light being refracted by a spherical glass container full of water (from Roger Bacon, De multiplicatione specierum)

Grosseteste was the founder of the famous Oxford Franciscan school. He built his work on Aristotle's vision of the dual path of scientific reasoning. Concluding from particular observations into a universal law, and then back again: from universal laws to prediction of particulars. Grosseteste called this "resolution and composition". Further, Grosseteste said that both paths should be verified through experimentation in order to verify the principles. These ideas established a tradition that carried forward to Padua and Galileo Galilei in the 17th century.

Under the tuition of Grosseteste and inspired by the writings of Arab alchemists who had preserved and built upon Aristotle's portrait of induction, Bacon described a repeating cycle of observation, hypothesis, experimentation, and the need for independent verification. He recorded the manner in which he conducted his experiments in precise detail so that others could reproduce and independently test his results—a cornerstone of the scientific method, and a continuation of the work of researchers like Al Battani.

Bacon and Grosseteste conducted investigations into optics, although much of it was similar to what was being done at the time by Arab scholars. Bacon did make a major contribution to the development of science in medieval Europe by writing to the pope to encourage the study of natural science in university courses and compiling several volumes recording the state of scientific knowledge in many fields at the time. He described the possible construction of a telescope, but there is no strong evidence of his having made one.

=== Late Middle Ages (AD 1300–1500) ===
The first half of the 14th century saw the scientific work of great thinkers. The logic studies by William of Occam led him to postulate a specific formulation of the principle of parsimony, known today as Occam's razor. This principle is one of the main heuristics used by modern science to select between two or more underdetermined theories, though it is only fair to point out that this principle was employed explicitly by both Aquinas and Aristotle before him.

As Western scholars became more aware (and more accepting) of controversial scientific treatises of the Byzantine and Islamic Empires these readings sparked new insights and speculation. The works of the early Byzantine scholar John Philoponus inspired Western scholars such as Jean Buridan to question the received wisdom of Aristotle's mechanics. Buridan developed the theory of impetus, which was a step towards the modern concept of inertia. Buridan anticipated Isaac Newton when he wrote:

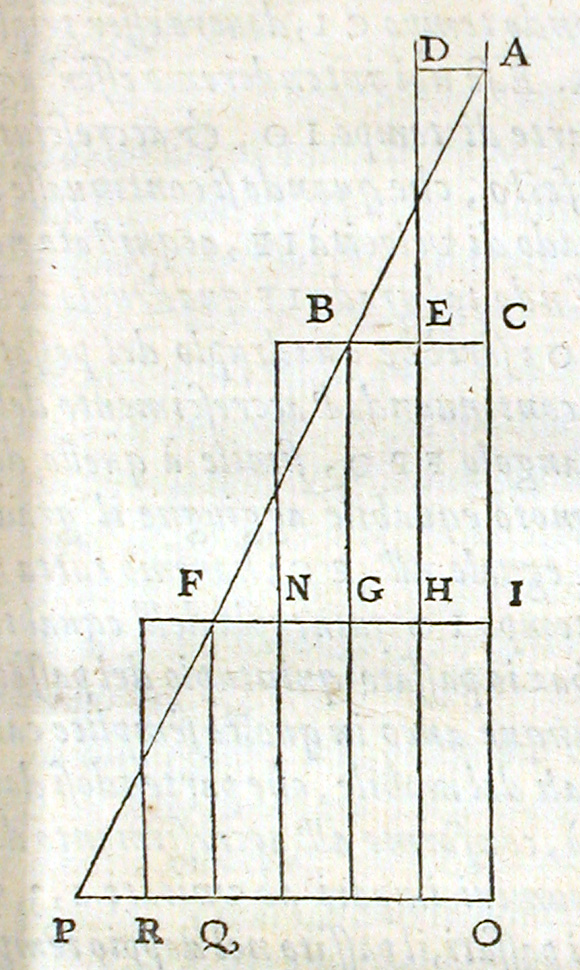
Galileo's demonstration of the law of the space traversed in case of uniformly varied motion – as Oresme had demonstrated centuries earlier.

... after leaving the arm of the thrower, the projectile would be moved by an impetus given to it by the thrower and would continue to be moved as long as the impetus remained stronger than the resistance, and would be of infinite duration were it not diminished and corrupted by a contrary force resisting it or by something inclining it to a contrary motion.

Thomas Bradwardine and his partners, the Oxford Calculators of Merton College, Oxford, distinguished kinematics from dynamics, emphasizing kinematics, and investigating instantaneous velocity. They formulated the mean speed theorem: a body moving with constant velocity travels distance and time equal to an accelerated body whose velocity is half the final speed of the accelerated body. They also demonstrated this theorem—the essence of "The Law of Falling Bodies"—long before Galileo, who has gotten the credit for this.

In his turn, Nicole Oresme showed that the reasons proposed by the physics of Aristotle against the movement of the Earth were not valid and adduced the argument of simplicity for the theory that the Earth moves, and not the heavens. Despite this argument in favor of the Earth's motion, Oresme fell back on the commonly held opinion that "everyone maintains, and I think myself, that the heavens do move and not the earth."

The historian of science Ronald Numbers notes that the modern scientific assumption of methodological naturalism can be also traced back to the work of these medieval thinkers:

By the late Middle Ages the search for natural causes had come to typify the work of Christian natural philosophers. Although characteristically leaving the door open for the possibility of direct divine intervention, they frequently expressed contempt for soft-minded contemporaries who invoked miracles rather than searching for natural explanations. The University of Paris cleric Jean Buridan (a. 1295–ca. 1358), described as "perhaps the most brilliant arts master of the Middle Ages," contrasted the philosopher's search for "appropriate natural causes" with the common folk's erroneous habit of attributing unusual astronomical phenomena to the supernatural. In the fourteenth century the natural philosopher Nicole Oresme (ca. 1320–82), who went on to become a Roman Catholic bishop, admonished that, in discussing various marvels of nature, "there is no reason to take recourse to the heavens, the last refuge of the weak, or demons, or to our glorious God as if He would produce these effects directly, more so than those effects whose causes we believe are well known to us."

However, a series of events that would be known as the Crisis of the Late Middle Ages was under its way. When the Black Death of 1348 came, it sealed a sudden end to the previous period of scientific progress. The plague killed a third of the people in Europe, especially in the crowded conditions of the towns, where the heart of innovations lay. Recurrences of the plague and other disasters caused a continuing decline in population for a century.

=== Renaissance (15th century) ===
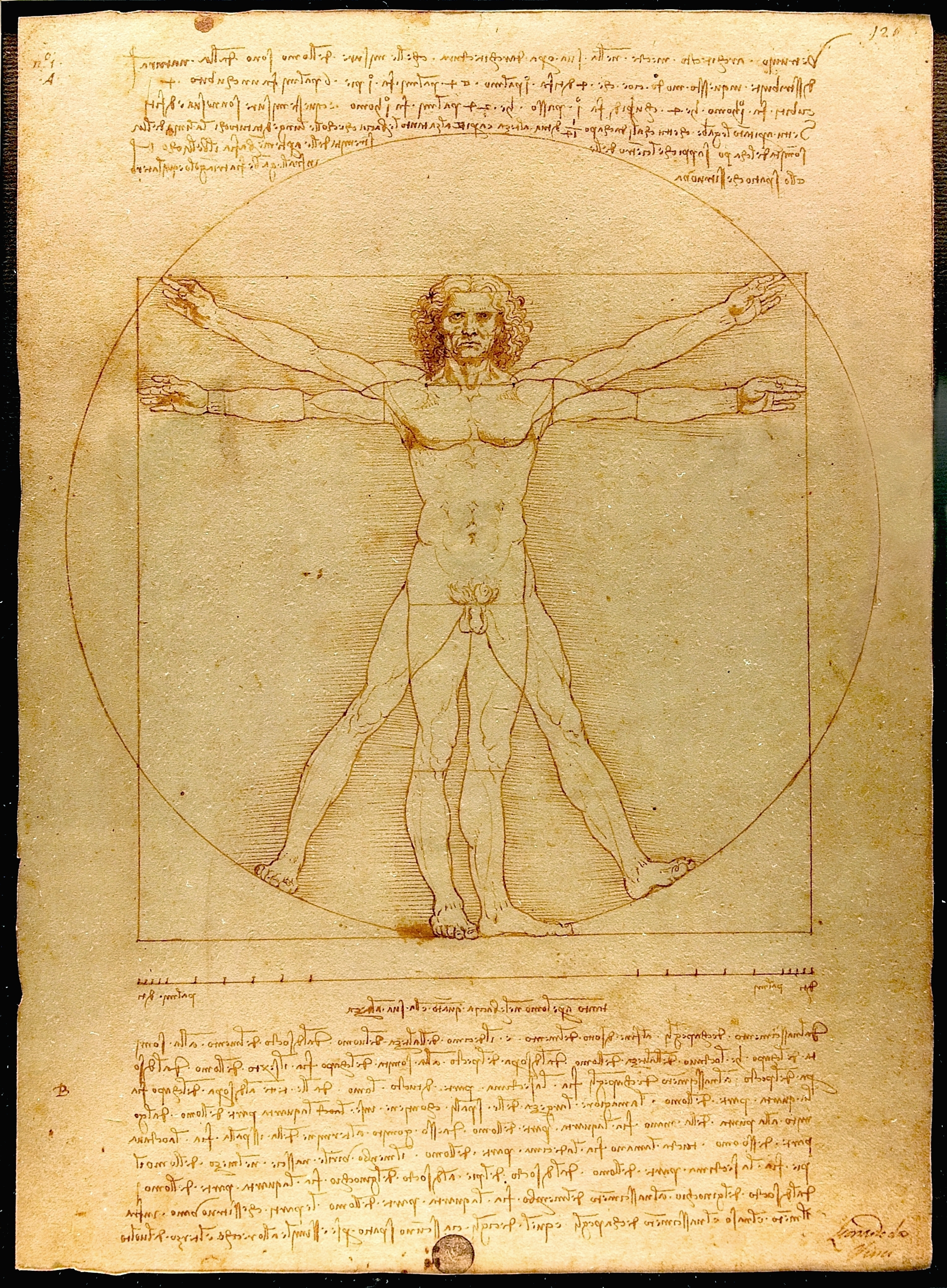
Leonardo da Vinci's Vitruvian Man

The 15th century saw the beginning of the cultural movement of the Renaissance. The rediscovery of Greek scientific texts, both ancient and medieval, was accelerated as the Byzantine Empire fell to the Ottoman Turks and many Byzantine scholars sought refuge in the West, particularly Italy.

The invention of printing facilitated dissemination of the printed word, democratized learning and allowed a faster propagation of new ideas.

Near the end of the Renaissance, the astronomer Nicolaus Copernicus proposed that the Earth revolves around the sun.

== Byzantine and Islamic influences ==
=== Byzantine interactions ===
Byzantine science played an important role in the transmission of classical knowledge to the Islamic world and to Renaissance Italy, and also in the transmission of medieval Arabic knowledge to Renaissance Italy. Its rich historiographical tradition preserved ancient knowledge upon which splendid art, architecture, literature and technological achievements were built.

Byzantine scientists preserved and continued the legacy of the great Ancient Greek mathematicians and put mathematics in practice. In early Byzantium (5th to 7th century) the architects and mathematicians Isidore of Miletus and Anthemius of Tralles used complex mathematical formulas to construct the great "Hagia Sophia" temple, a magnificent technological breakthrough for its time and for centuries afterwards due to its striking geometry, bold design, and height. In late Byzantium (9th to 12th century), mathematicians like Michael Psellos considered mathematics as a way to interpret the world.

John Philoponus, a Byzantine scholar in the 500s, was the first person to systematically question Aristotle's teaching of physics. This served as an inspiration for Galileo Galilei ten centuries later as Galileo cited Philoponus substantially in his works when Galileo also argued why Aristotelian physics was flawed during the Scientific Revolution.

=== Islamic interactions ===
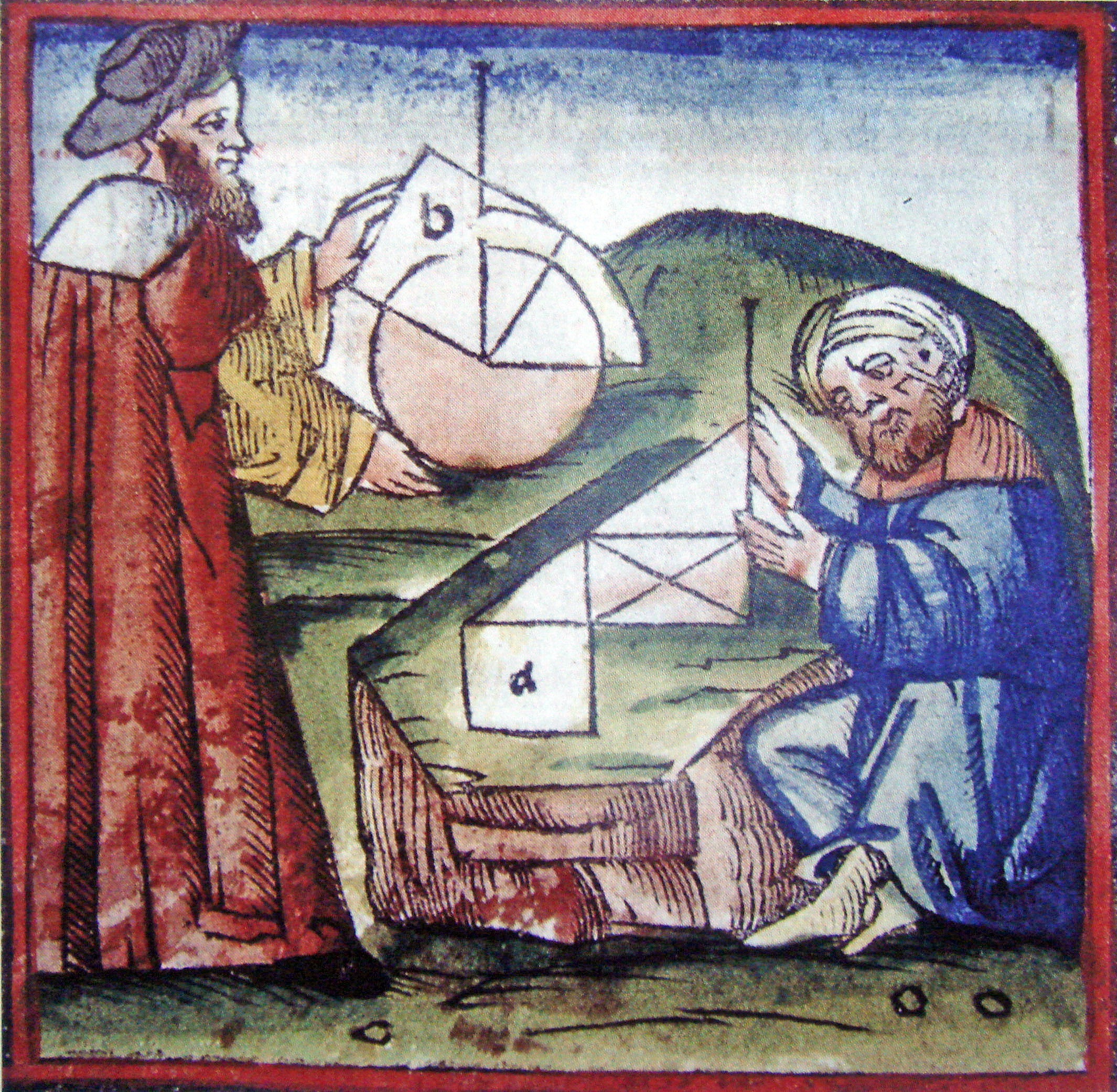
A Westerner and an Arab learning geometry in the 15th century

The Byzantine Empire initially provided the medieval Islamic world with Ancient Greek texts on astronomy and mathematics for translation into Arabic. Later with the emerging of the Muslim world, Byzantine scientists such as Gregory Chioniades translated Arabic texts on Islamic astronomy, mathematics and science into Medieval Greek, including the works of Ja'far ibn Muhammad Abu Ma'shar al-Balkhi, Ibn Yunus, al-Khazini, Muhammad ibn Mūsā al-Khwārizmī and Nasīr al-Dīn al-Tūsī among others. There were also some Byzantine scientists who used Arabic transliterations to describe certain scientific concepts instead of the equivalent Ancient Greek terms (such as the use of the Arabic talei instead of the Ancient Greek horoscopus). Byzantine science thus played an important role in not only transmitting ancient Greek knowledge to Western Europe and the Islamic world, but in also transmitting Islamic knowledge to Western Europe. Byzantine scientists also became acquainted with Sassanid and Indian astronomy through citations in some Arabic works.

== Gallery ==
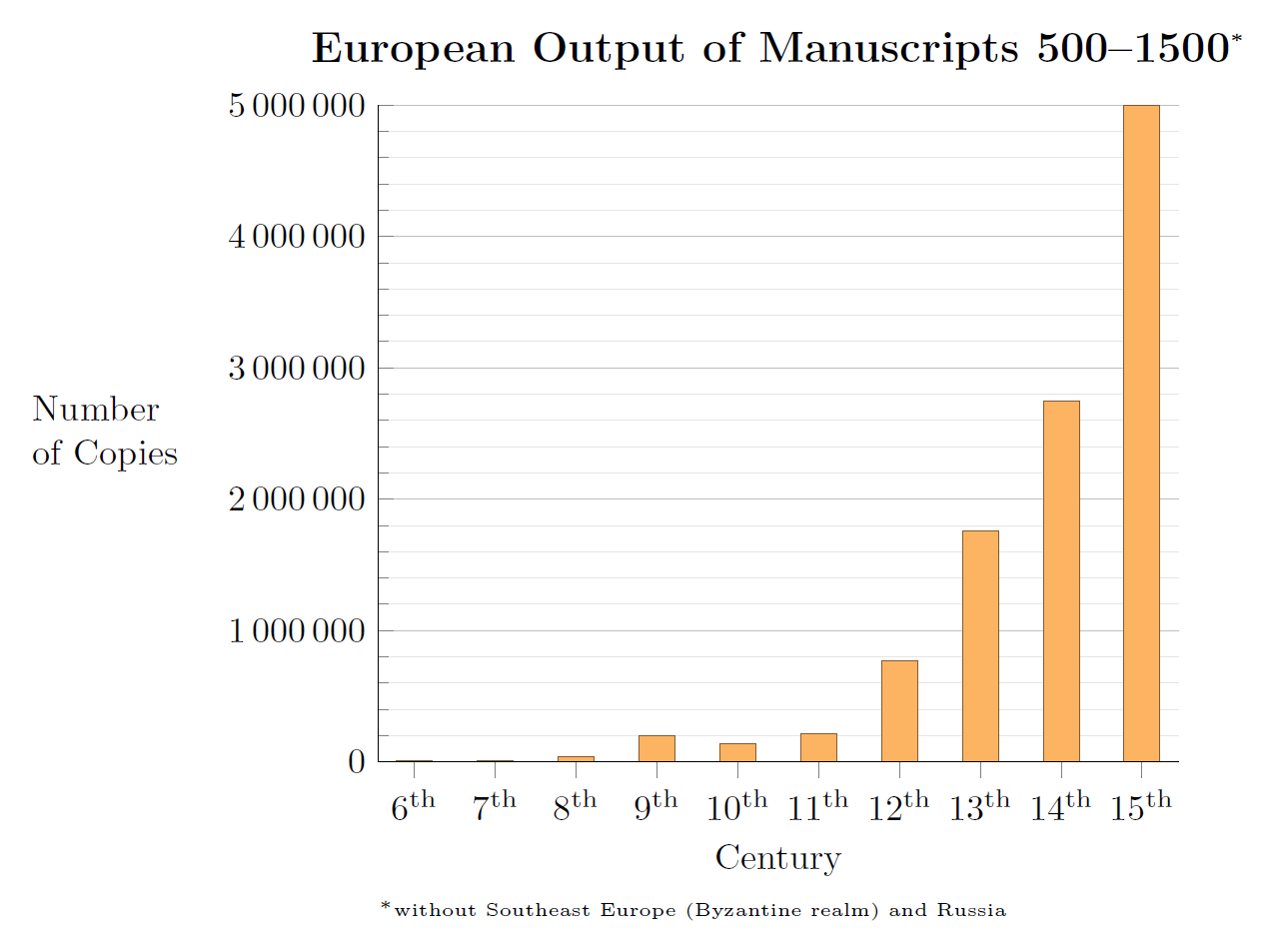
European output of manuscripts 500–1500

== See also ==
- Science and the Catholic Church
- List of medieval European scientists
- History of science
- Scientific Revolution
- The Copernican Question: Prognostication, Skepticism, and Celestial Order, a 2011 book by Robert S. Westman.
