= The Copernican Question =

Book by Robert S. Westman

- Author: Robert S. Westman
- Language: English
- Subject: History of Renaissance astronomy, astrology, and scholarship
- Published: July, 2011. (University of California Press).
- Publication place: United States
- Media type: Print and e-book
- Pages: 704
- ISBN: 9780520254817
- OCLC: 747411317
- Dewey Decimal: 520.94/09031
- LC Class: QB29 W47 2011
- Text: The Copernican Question at the book publisher's website

The Copernican Question: Prognostication, Skepticism, and Celestial Order is a 704-page book written by Robert S. Westman and published by University of California Press (Berkeley, Los Angeles, London) in 2011 and in 2020 (paperback). The book is a broad historical overview of Europe's astronomical and astrological culture leading to Copernicus's De revolutionibus and follows the scholarly debates that took place roughly over three generations after Copernicus.

== Summary ==
In 1543, Nicolaus Copernicus publicly defended his hypothesis that the earth is a planet and the sun a body resting near the center of a finite universe. This view challenged a long-held, widespread consensus about the order of the planets. But why did Copernicus make this bold proposal? And why did it matter? The Copernican Question revisits this pivotal moment in the history of science and puts political and cultural developments at the center rather than the periphery of the story. When Copernicus first hit on his theory around 1510, European society at all social levels was consumed with chronic warfare, the syphilis pandemic and recurrence of the bubonic plague, and, soon thereafter, Martin Luther’s break with the Catholic church. Apocalyptic prophecies about the imminent end of the world were rife; the relatively new technology of print was churning out reams of alarming astrological prognostications even as astrology itself came under serious attack in July 1496 from the Renaissance Florentine polymath Giovanni Pico della Mirandola (1463-1494). Copernicus knew Pico’s work, possibly as early as the year of its publication in Bologna, the city in which he lived with the astrological prognosticator and astronomer, Domenico Maria di Novara (1454-1504). Against Pico’s multi-pronged critique, Copernicus sought to protect the credibility of astrology by reforming the astronomical foundations on which astrology rested. But, his new hypothesis came at the cost of introducing new uncertainties and engendering enormous resistance from traditionalists in the universities. Westman shows that efforts to answer Pico’s critique became a crucial unifying theme over the three generations of the first phase of what he calls the early modern scientific movement—a “long sixteenth century,” from the 1490s to the 1610s—that laid the foundations for the great transformations in natural philosophy in the century that followed.

== Central Themes, Patterns, Theses ==
1. To avoid projecting current classifications of knowledge onto the past, Westman argues that categories of knowledge and their meanings should be regarded as bound to time and place. In Copernicus's lifetime (1473–1543) and well into the seventeenth century, astronomy and astrology constituted a compound subject, called “the science of the stars.” Each part of this disciplinary couple could be further subdivided into theoretical and practical parts. Authors who contributed to the literature of the heavens described themselves with various names that might look familiar but which no longer carry currently specialized meanings, such as “mathematician” or “physician and astronomer.” Westman uses “astronomer-astrologer,” first coined by Gérard Simon (Kepler astronome astrologue, Paris, 1979) and also his own term, “heavenly practitioner”—terms of reference intended to be consistent with the historical agents’ own self-designations. Similarly, he contends that historical actors located the topic of planetary order within the domains of theoretical astronomy and theoretical astrology—as opposed to their practical counterparts.

2. Copernicus's initial turn to the heliocentric planetary arrangement occurred in the context of his encounter with Pico della Mirandola’s wide-ranging attack on the science of the stars and, in particular, Pico’s contention that astrologers did not agree about the order of the planets (Disputationes adversus astrologiam divinatricem [Bologna: Benedictus Hectoris, 1496]).

Copernicus was especially bothered by the uncertain ordering of Venus and Mercury. However, like Johannes Regiomontanus’s Epitome of Ptolemy’s Almagest (Venice, 1496), which was an important model for Copernicus's De revolutionibus (Nuremberg, 1543), astrology is nowhere mentioned in either work.

3. The controversy about the principles of astrological prognostication persisted as a major motive that drove debates about the heavens from the late fifteenth- to the early seventeenth century. Those debates took place within a nexus of political-cultural arrangements defined by the churches (both Catholic and Protestant), the universities and the royal, princely and imperial courts. At mid-sixteenth century Wittenberg, the Lutheran reformer university rector, Philipp Melanchthon (1497-1560), advocated a theology that stressed divine presence in nature and prophetic or prognosticative activity as a natural, inborn human desire to know God’s works. Astronomer-astrologers at Wittenberg, most notably Erasmus Reinhold (1511-1553) and his many students, read De revolutionibus selectively, ignoring the re-ordering of the planets and, instead, extracted from Copernicus’s work those calculational models that could be geometrically transformed into the framework of a stationary earth. Superficially, this “Wittenberg Interpretation” has sometimes been taken to refer to the methodological view known as “instrumentalism”—that scientific theories are just useful instruments of prediction—but Reinhold retained a “realist” view with respect to the solid spheres that carried the planets.

4. In the face of Pico's critique there were different kinds of efforts to improve astrological prognostication during the sixteenth century and Copernicus's proposal to reform theoretical astronomy was but one of them.

5. The appearance of unforeseen, singular, celestial novelties between 1572 and 1604 pushed a handful of astronomer-astrologers to consider whether alternative planetary orderings, including those of Copernicus, Tycho Brahe (1546–1601), Nicolaus Reimars Baer (1551–1600) and Paul Wittich (1546–1586) could better explain the unanticipated phenomena.

6. This consideration of alternatives was the first major instance of underdetermination in the history of science (where the same observational evidence equally supports two, logically different hypotheses), although the historical agents were unaware of the epistemological generality of that problem. It resulted in new kinds of controversies and raised unprecedented questions about weighting the criteria for adjudicating among different hypotheses, including ancient authority, scriptural compatibility, simplicity, explanatory breadth, predictive accuracy and physical coherence.

7. The second generation followers of Copernicus (Michael Maestlin [1550-1631], Thomas Digges [1546-1595], Giordano Bruno [1548-1600], Christopher Rothmann [ca. 1550-1600]) did not constitute a socially- and intellectually-unified movement. And the failure of the high-profile third-generation proponents Johannes Kepler (1571–1630) and Galileo Galilei (1564–1638) to forge a cooperative and productive alliance around their defense of the Copernican theory is a particularly notable instance of this larger pattern of disunity.

8. Shared social context underdetermined the adoption of new theoretical claims. Many Copernicans, for example, were attracted to court settings because those spaces were more open to novelty than traditional university settings. But while court patronage allowed for rhetorical and philosophical diversity, it fails to explain why particular figures, like Galileo, adopted specific theoretical claims, such as the Copernican hypothesis.

9. Galileo's famous telescopic claims can be thought of as introducing the discovery of recurrent novelties into the debate about alternative hypotheses. Unlike novas and comets, which seemed to appear only when God wanted to send a message, a human being with an instrument could make phenomena like the moon's rough surface, never-before-seen distant stars or Jupiter's ‘planets’ appear and disappear. Success in convincing others of the reality of these phenomena occurred largely through print rather than by live demonstrations with the instrument.

10. The main social locus of change of belief was not some twentieth-century-like “scientific community,” but the master-disciple relationship that was rooted in the all-male-cultures of the universities and modeled on the paternalistic structures of the family.

11. The Copernican Question proposes a new periodization that argues for an “early modern scientific movement”—chronologically, a “Long Sixteenth Century” that began with the late-fifteenth century conflict about the status of astrological prognostication and ended in the early seventeenth century when the Catholic Church extended its skepticism (and its enforcement machinery) about naturalistic foreknowledge to the reality of the heliocentric planetary ordering. Rather than revolutionary, paradigmatic rupture, this periodization offers a picture of gradual, multi-generational change that broadly conjoins a backward-looking veneration for ancient tradition with a forward-looking, modernizing valuation of change and novelty.

12. Kepler’ Epitome of Copernican Astronomy (1618–21) and Galileo's Dialogue Concerning the Two Chief World Systems (1632) consolidated a critical mass of novel physical claims and arguments developed between the 1580s and the telescopic discoveries of 1610–13. While Kepler and Galileo disagreed on some important issues (Galileo, for example, never accepted Kepler's elliptical orbits), together their presentations made possible a multifaceted, robust public debate (1620s-40s) that a new generation of modernizing natural philosophers—including René Descartes (1596–1650), Pierre Gassendi (1592–1655), Marin Mersenne (1588–1648), and Thomas Hobbes (1588–1679)—selectively incorporated into their own original arguments with tradition-bound natural philosophers in the universities. In this period, the Copernican Question became a struggle that overtly involved natural philosophy, a battle framed as one between competing “world systems”.

13. By 1651, the Jesuit astronomer Giovanni Battista Riccioli (1598–1651), writing in the shadow of Galileo's Trial in 1633, produced a massive work (Almagestum novum) in which he assembled 49 arguments in favor of the daily and annual motions of the Earth as against 77 arguments contrary to the Earth's motions. While presenting the decision between the two as a contrasting of probable arguments, in the end, he decisively eliminated any uncertainty by appeal to “both sacred authority and Divine Scriptures.”

14. Although the midcentury modernizers were all followers of Copernicus's system, like the late-sixteenth defenders of Copernicus, they continued to be disunified in the kinds of principles and arguments to which they appealed. For example, a proposal that side-stepped the difficult technical arguments grounding Kepler's ellipses and Galileo's falling bodies and which helped to popularize support with new audiences was the argument for a plurality of worlds. Building on Giordano Bruno's claim that God must have used his omnipotence to create an infinite universe with innumerable worlds and Galileo's telescopic discovery of a moon with Earthlike characteristics, John Wilkins argued that an infinite, omnipotent god must have used his power to create other living beings to occupy a plurality of other sun-centered worlds. In his Discovery of a World in the Moone (1638), Wilkins broached the probability of an Earthlike moon with lunar inhabitants, the dark areas interpreted as seas, the entire body surrounded by a vaporous atmosphere. The existence of Lunatics was further testimony to the divine wisdom. And the pluralist argument became a significant resource for attracting adherents to a multiplicity of sun-centered systems in an infinite universe.

15. In England, prominent midcentury astrologers like Vincent Wing (1619–1668) and Thomas Streete (1621?-1689) learned their Copernicus through Kepler and Descartes and associated the accuracy of their predictions with Kepler's Rudolfine Tables (1627).

16. Isaac Newton (1642–1727) and Robert Hooke (1635–1702) were members of a generation that encountered the Copernican Question not directly through Copernicus's De revolutionibus but as a controversy already matured and refracted through the midcentury literature of the heavens and natural philosophy. Newton himself made his earliest acquaintance with the Copernican ordering and Kepler's elliptical orbits through the astronomer-astrologers Wing and Streete. Ultimately, however, he rejected the claims of astrology as a form of idolatry, much as did Pico—based upon the projection of human qualities onto the stars and planets—and contrary to Newton's belief in the power of God to act directly in the world without need of intermediaries. However, like Copernicus, Newton never published his views about astrology.

16. About the problem of closure. Westman argues that “the diversity already evident at the beginning of the [seventeenth] century persisted among Copernicus’s midcentury followers. To identify oneself publicly with the Copernican arrangement or to declare its truth did not entail allegiance to the uniform set of commitments in natural philosophy evoked by the nineteenth- and twentieth century term “Copernicanism”. The Copernican question achieved closure—an end to questioning and criticism from competing alternatives—in different ways among different audiences. These endings occurred through no single proof and with audiences as variously overlapping as almanac readers, practicing astrologers, planetary table makers, extraterrestrializers, itinerant scientific lecturers and, of course, philosophizing astronomers and high-end, new-style natural philosophers.”

17. Newton’s powerful achievement was his construction of a natural philosophy of mathematizable forces in which the sun’s position at or near the center of the planets could be deduced rather than assumed as a premise, as Copernicus had done: “The Copernican system is proved a priori,” Newton wrote, “for if the common center of gravity is calculated for any position of the planets it either falls in the body of the Sun or will always be very close to it.” And, unlike Copernicus, Tycho Brahe or Kepler in the long sixteenth century, he made no effort to fix astrology.

== See also ==
- The Scientific Revolution
- The History of science in the Renaissance
- The Renaissance
- History of astronomy
