= Western culture =

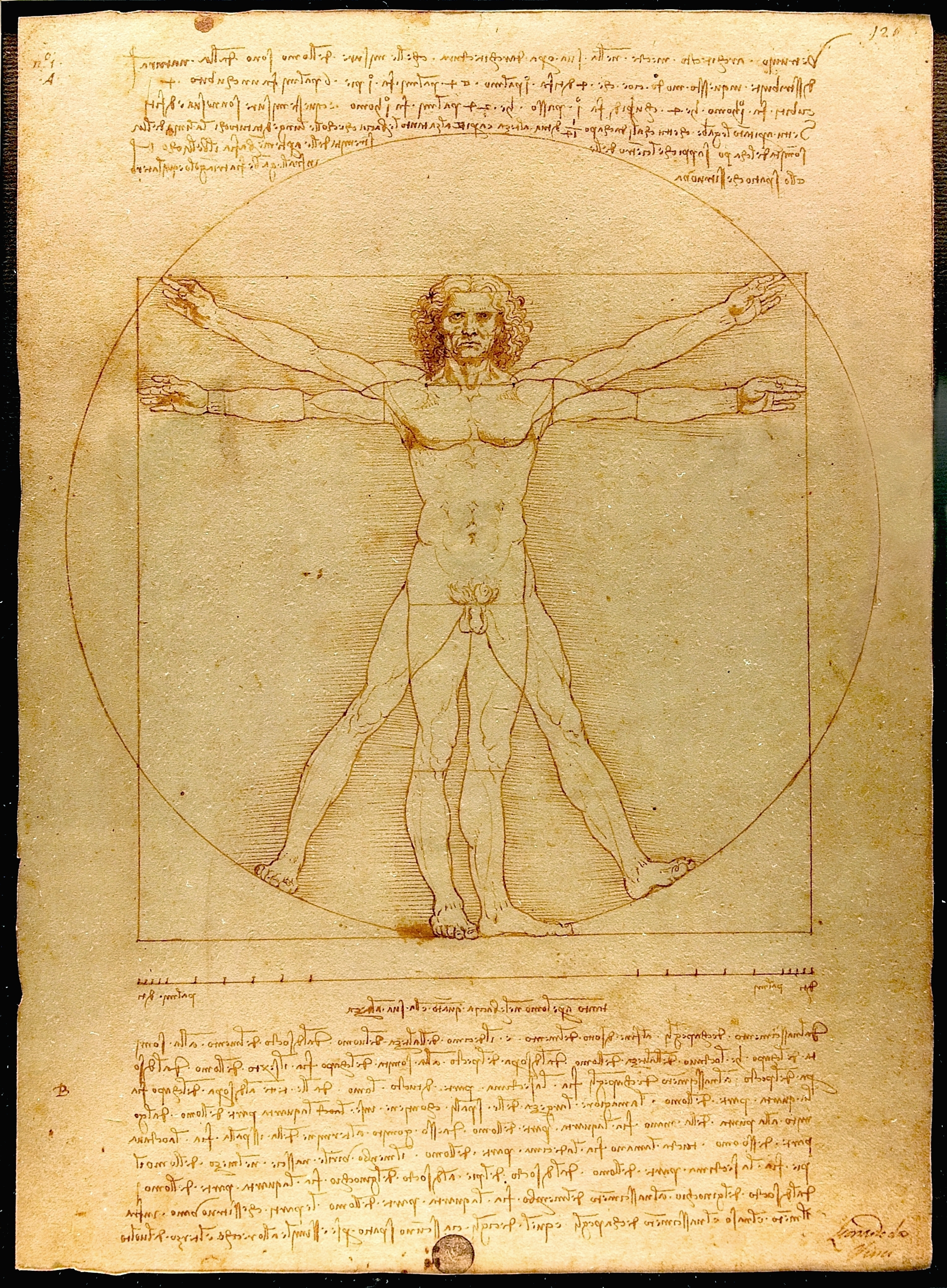
Leonardo da Vinci's Vitruvian Man, based on the correlations of ideal human proportions with geometry described by the ancient Roman architect Vitruvius in Book III of his treatise De architectura.

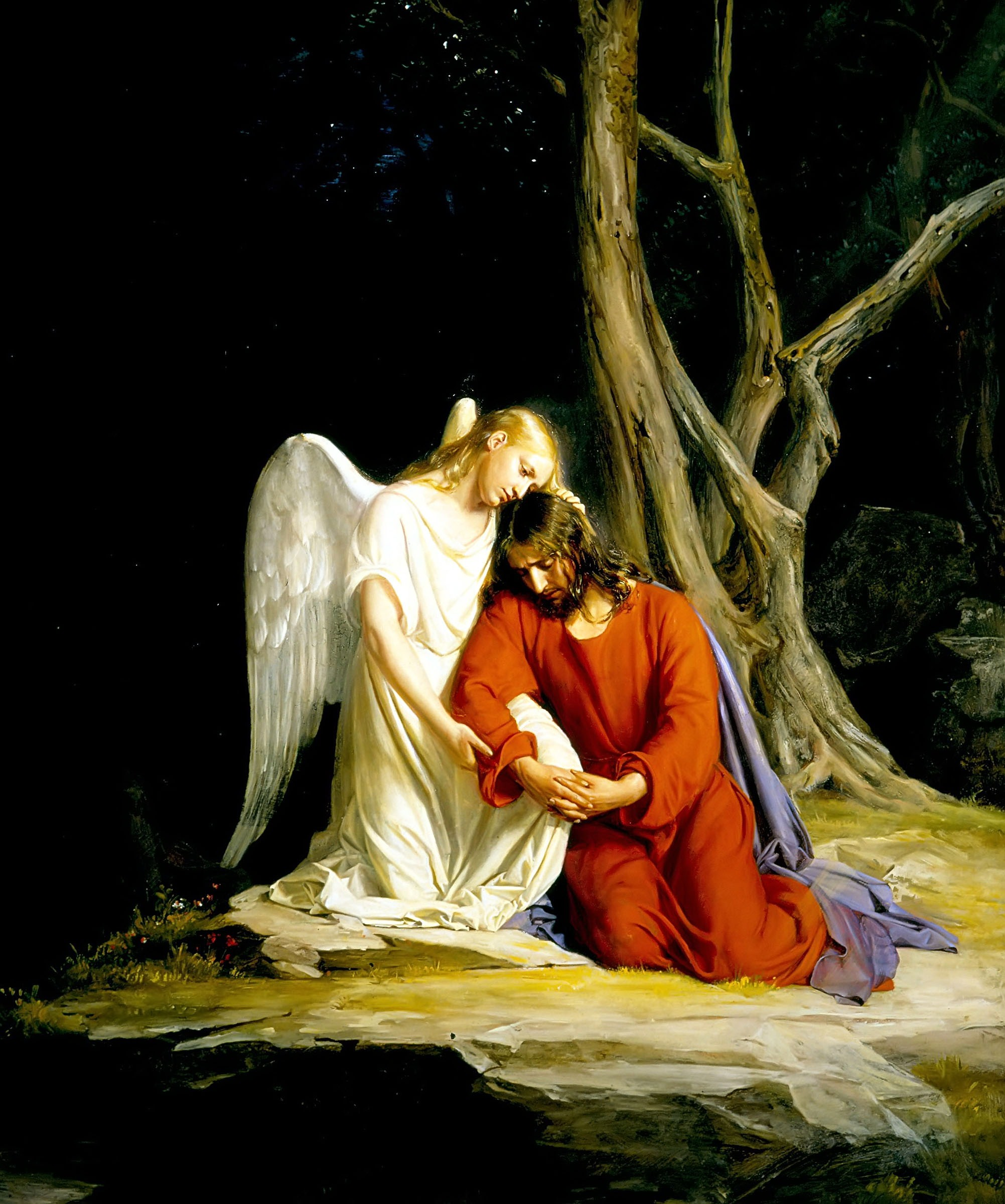
Kristus i Getsemane (1873), an angel comforting Jesus Christ before his arrest in the Garden of Gethsemane, by Carl Heinrich Bloch.

Western culture, also known as Western civilization, European civilization, Occidental culture, Western society or simply the West, is the externally cohesive yet internally diverse culture and cultural heritage of the Western world. The term "Western" encompasses the social norms, ethical values, traditional customs, belief systems, political systems, artifacts and technologies primarily rooted in European and Mediterranean histories. A broad concept, "Western culture" does not relate to a region with fixed members or geographical confines. It generally refers to the classical era cultures of ancient Greece, ancient Rome, and their Christian successors that expanded across the Mediterranean basin and Europe, and later circulated around the world predominantly through colonization and globalization.

The phrase “Western civilization” appears to have become common by the late 1800s. One study notes that it was being used without special explanation by at least 1890, while earlier 19th century English-language writers generally talked about “European civilization”. Previously, "Christendom" was the only widely used umbrella concept for centuries. Historically, scholars have closely associated the idea of Western culture with the classical era of Greco-Roman antiquity. However, scholars also acknowledge that other cultures, like ancient Egypt, the Phoenician city-states, and several Near-Eastern cultures stimulated and influenced it. The Hellenistic period also promoted syncretism, blending Greek, Roman, and Near-Eastern cultures. Major advances in literature, engineering, and science shaped the Hellenistic Jewish culture, from which the earliest Christians and the Greek New Testament emerged. The eventual Christianization of Europe in late antiquity would ensure that Christianity, particularly the Catholic Church, remained a dominant force in Western culture for many centuries to follow.

The Early Middle Ages, after the fall of the Western Roman Empire, were characterized by depopulation, deurbanization, and the collapse of long-distance trade, as Europe suffered hundreds of years of raids and invasions from Vikings, Muslims, and Magyars from the north, south and east. Following that long period of war and instability, however, medieval Europe experienced gradual improvements, including several medieval renaissances. 12th-century Latin translations brought ancient Greek and Roman texts back to central and western Europe from the Islamic world and helped medieval scholasticism to grow and thrive. Medieval Christianity is credited with creating the modern university, the modern hospital system, scientific economics, and natural law (which would later influence the creation of international law). During the Renaissance, the rise of humanism, the spread of the movable type printing press, the encounter with the Americas and the advance of the Reformation each transformed European culture.

The Scientific Revolution and the Enlightenment of the 17th and 18th centuries advanced ideals of empirical inquiry, political pluralism and individual rights. These ideas influenced revolutions across Europe and the Americas, spurred the development of modern democratic institutions and, together with the Industrial Revolution, transformed Western society. In the 19th and 20th centuries, the influence of Enlightenment rationalism continued with the rise of secularism and liberal democracy, while the Industrial Revolution fueled economic and technological growth. The expansion of civil rights and the decline of religious authority marked significant cultural shifts. Tendencies that have come to define modern Western societies include the concept of political pluralism, individualism, prominent subcultures or countercultures, and increasing cultural syncretism resulting from globalization and immigration.

== Terminology ==
The West as a geographical area is unclear and undefined. There is some disagreement about which nations should or should not be included in the category, when, and why. Certainly related conceptual terminology has changed over time in scope, meaning, and use. The term "western" draws on an affiliation with, or a perception of, a shared philosophy, worldview, political, and religious heritage grounded in the Greco-Roman world, the legacy of the Roman Empire, and medieval concepts of Christendom.

For example, whether the Eastern Roman Empire or countries influenced by its legacy, should be counted as "Western" is an example of the term's ambiguity. This can be traced to the affiliation between the culture of ancient Rome and that of Classical Greece, a persistent Greek East and Latin West language-split within the Roman Empire, and the permanent split of the Roman Empire in 395 into Western and Eastern halves. Pope Leo III's transfer of the Roman Empire from the Eastern Roman Empire to the Frankish King Charlemagne in the form of the Holy Roman Empire in 800, the Great Schism of 1054, and the devastating Fourth Crusade of 1204 also influenced what is considered the West.

As Europeans discovered the extra-European world, old concepts adapted. The area that had formerly been considered the Orient ("the East") became the "Near East"as European countries began to interact with Meiji Japan and Qing China in the 19th century. Thus the Sino-Japanese War in 1894–1895 occurred in the "Far East" while troubles surrounding the decline of the Ottoman Empire occurred simultaneously in the "Near East." (Note: British archaeologist D. G. Hogarth published The Nearer East in 1902, which helped to define the term and its extent, including Albania, Montenegro, southern Serbia and Bulgaria, Greece, Egypt, all Ottoman lands, the entire Arabian Peninsula, and Western parts of Iran.) The term "Middle East" in the mid-19th century included the territory east of the Ottoman Empire but west of China.

Some philosophers have questioned whether Western culture can be considered a historically sound, unified body of thought. For example, Kwame Anthony Appiah pointed out in 2016 that many fundamental influences on Western culture—such as Greek philosophy—are shared by the Islamic world. Appiah further argues that while the origin of a shared "European" identity can be traced to the 8th-century Muslim invasion of the Iberia, it was not until the 19th and 20th centuries that "Western culture" emerged.

== History ==
The earliest civilizations which influenced the development of Western culture were those of Mesopotamia; the area of the Tigris–Euphrates river system. The area largely corresponds to modern-day Iraq, northeastern Syria, southeastern Turkey and southwestern Iran, known as the cradle of civilization. Ancient Egypt similarly had a strong influence on Western culture.

Phoenician mercantilism and the introduction of the alphabetical script boosted state formation in the Aegean and current-day Italy and Spain, spawning civilizations in the Mediterranean such as ancient Carthage, ancient Greece, Etruria, and ancient Rome.

The Greeks contrasted themselves with both their Eastern neighbors (such as the Trojans) as well as their Northern neighbors (who they considered barbarians). Concepts of what is the West arose from the legacies of the Western and the Eastern Roman Empire. Later, ideas of the West were formed by the concepts of Latin Christendom and the Holy Roman Empire. Modern Western thought originates primarily from Greco-Roman and Christian traditions, with influence from the Germanic, Celtic and Slavic peoples, and includes the ideals of the Middle Ages, Renaissance, Reformation, Scientific Revolution and the Enlightenment.

=== The West of the Mediterranean Region during Antiquity ===
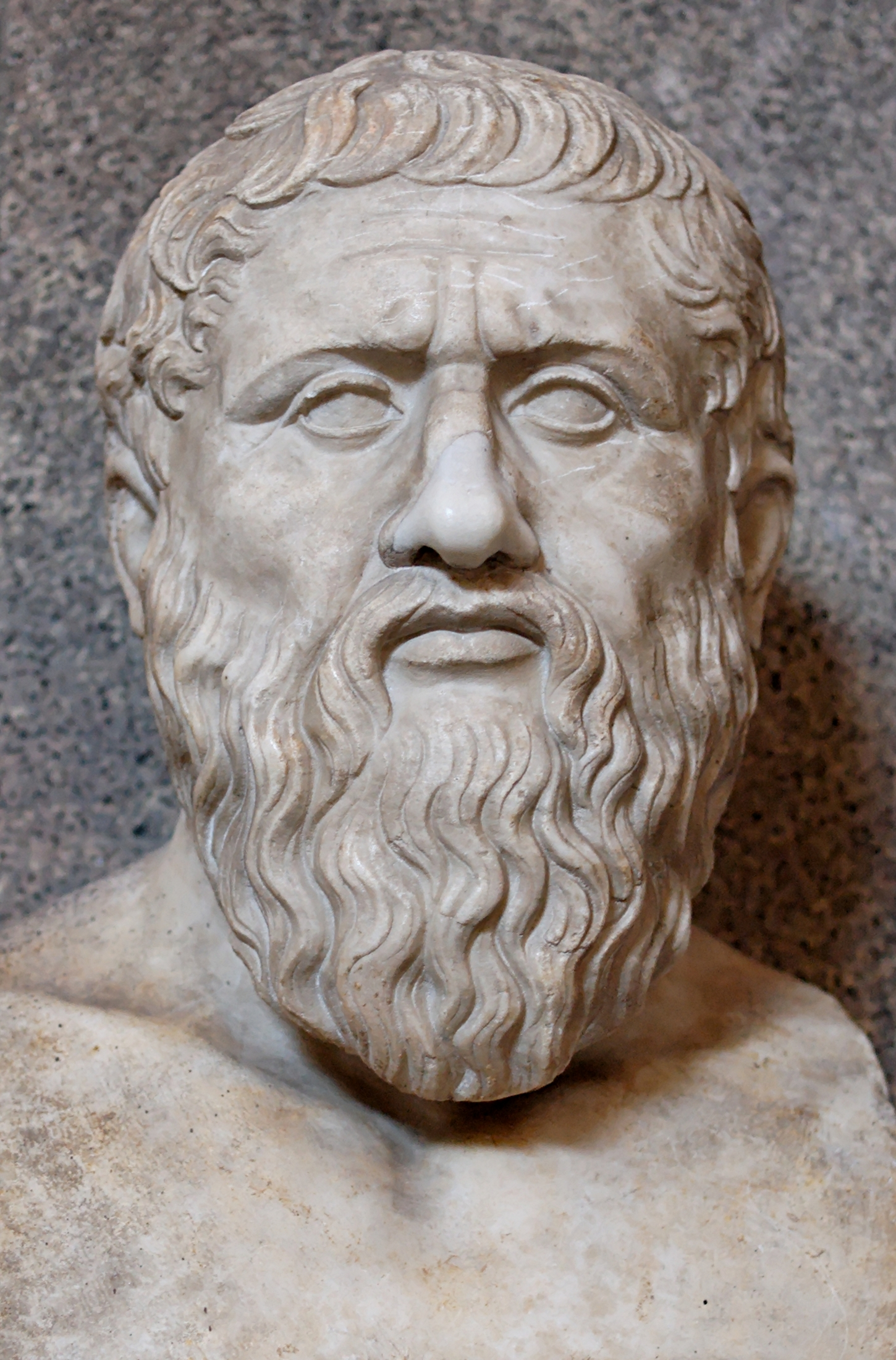
Plato, arguably the most influential figure in early Western philosophy.

While the concept of a "West" did not exist until the Roman Republic, the roots of the concept can be traced back to ancient Greece. Since Homeric literature (the Trojan Wars), through the accounts of the Persian Wars of Greeks against Persians by Herodotus, and right up until the time of Alexander the Great, there was a paradigm of a contrast between Greeks and other civilizations. Greeks felt they were the most civilized and saw themselves (in the formulation of Aristotle) as something between the advanced civilizations of the Near East (who they viewed as soft and slavish) and the wild barbarians of most of Europe to the north. During this period writers like Herodotus and Xenophon would highlight the importance of freedom in the Ancient Greek world, as opposed to the perceived slavery of the so-called barbaric world.

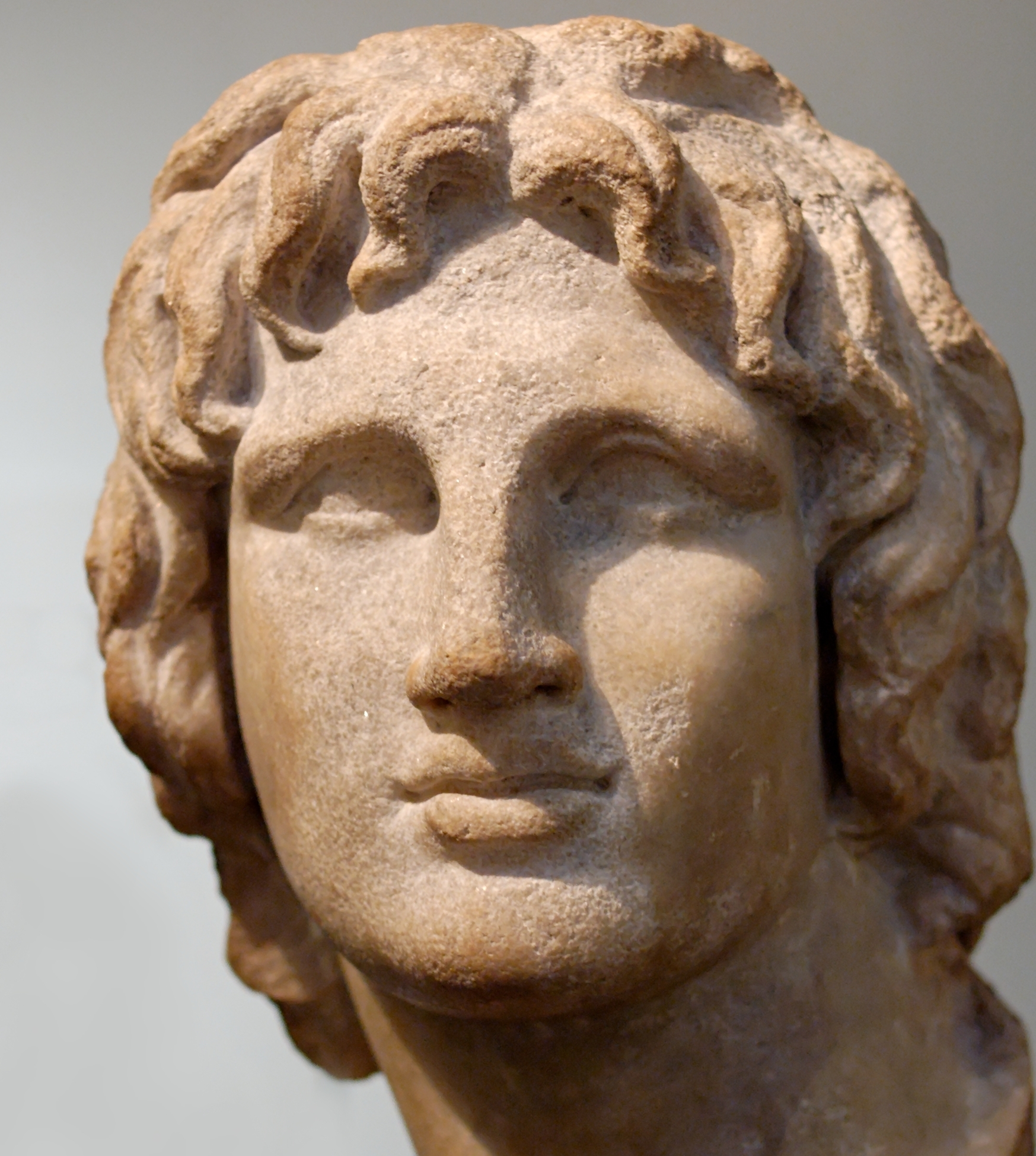
Alexander the Great

Alexander's conquests led to the emergence of a Hellenistic civilization, representing a synthesis of Greek and Near-Eastern cultures in the Eastern Mediterranean region. The Near-Eastern civilizations of ancient Egypt and the Levant, which came under Greek rule, became part of the Hellenistic world. The most important Hellenistic centre of learning was Ptolemaic Egypt, which attracted Greek, Egyptian, Jewish, Persian, Phoenician and even Indian scholars.

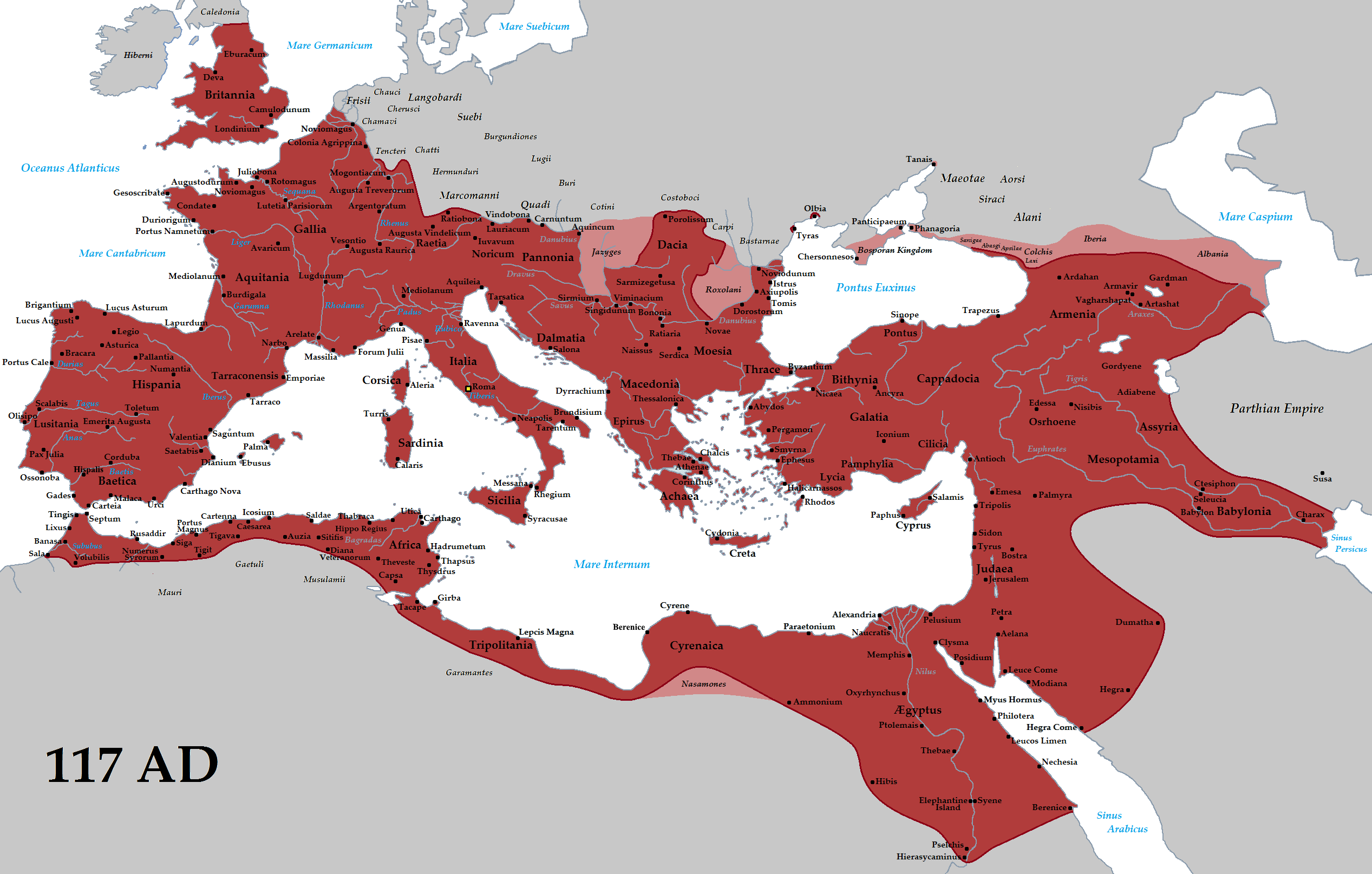
The Roman Empire (red) and its client states (pink) at its greatest extent in 117 AD under emperor Trajan

Hellenistic science, philosophy, architecture, literature and art later provided a foundation embraced and built upon by the Roman Empire as it swept up Europe and the Mediterranean world, including the Hellenistic world, in its conquests in the 1st century BCE in which the whole Mediterranean became essentially a Roman inland sea. The influence of Hellenism coexisted in the Empire with a cultural divide between a predominantly Latin-speaking West and Greek-speaking East. For about five hundred years, the Latin-speaking Western Roman Empire consisted of Western Europe and Northwest Africa, while the Greek-speaking Eastern Roman Empire consisted of the Balkans, Asia Minor, Egypt and Levant. The "Greek" East was generally wealthier and more advanced than the "Latin" West. With the exception of Italia, the wealthiest provinces of the Roman Empire were in the East, particularly Roman Egypt which was the wealthiest Roman province outside of Italia.

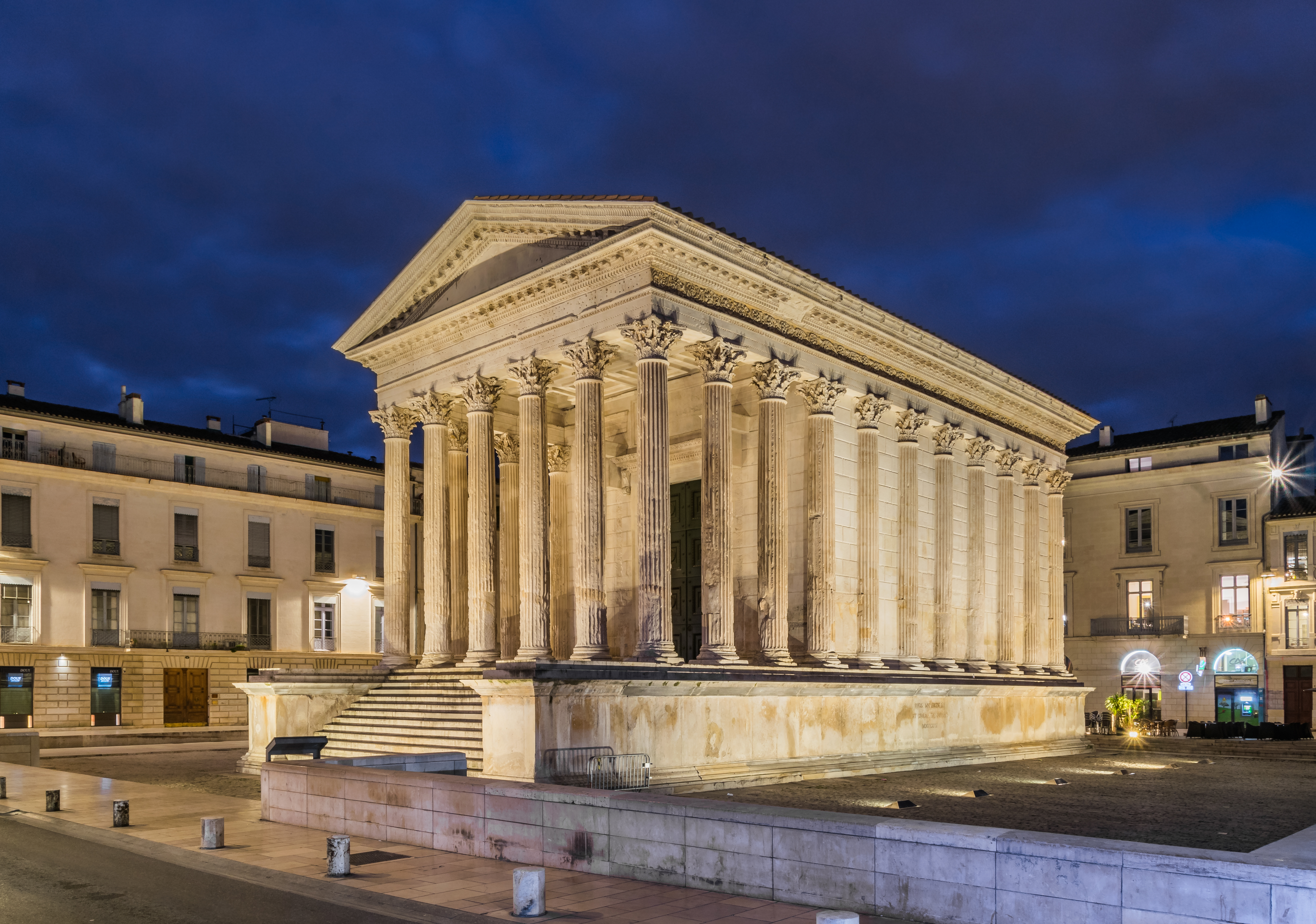
The Maison Carrée in Nîmes, one of the best-preserved Roman temples

From the time of Alexander the Great (the Hellenistic period), Greek civilization came in contact with Jewish civilization. Christianity would eventually emerge from the syncretism of Hellenic culture, Roman culture, and Second Temple Judaism, gradually spreading across the Roman Empire and eclipsing its antecedents and influences.

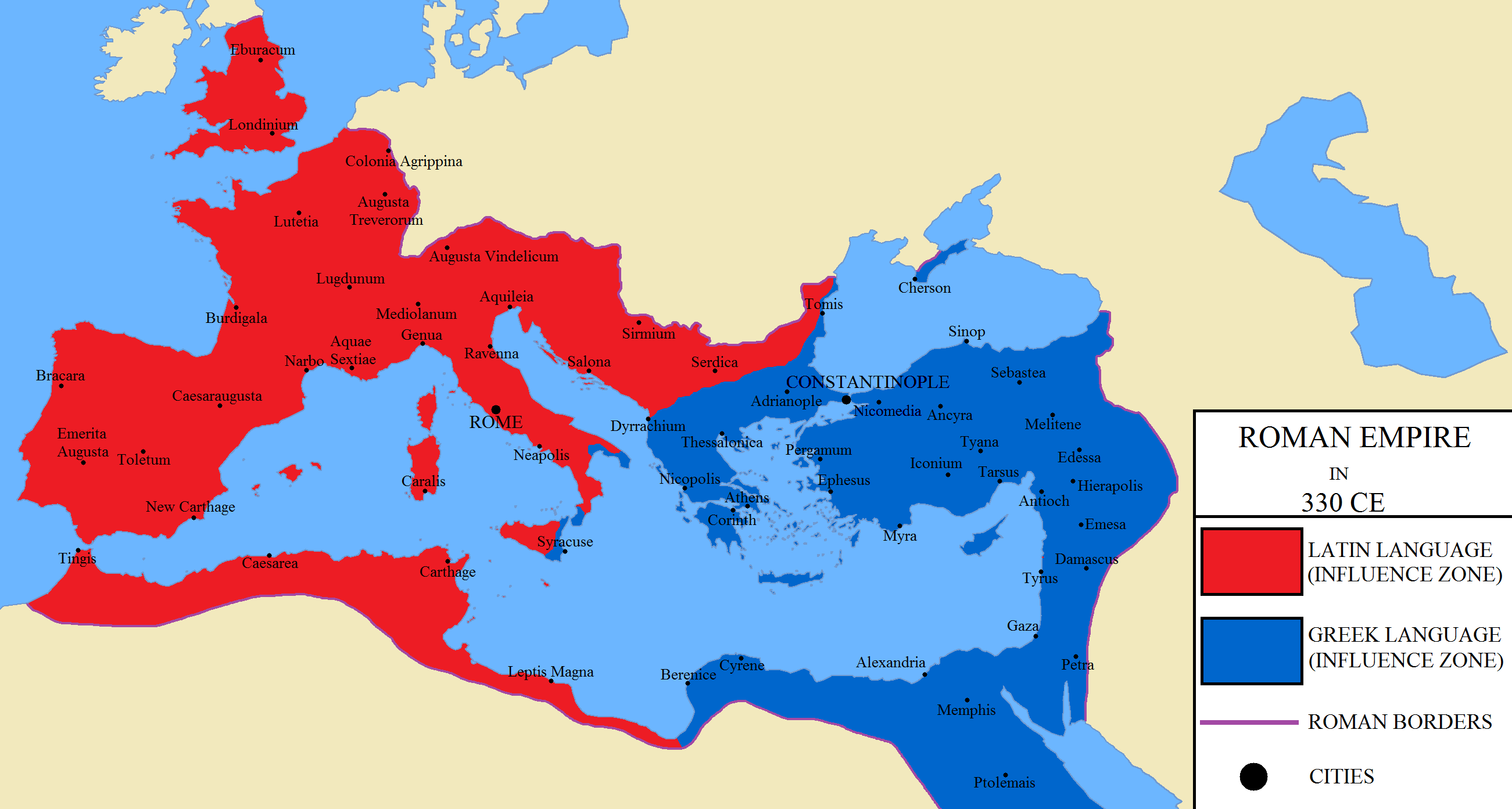
The Roman Empire in 330. The area in red shows the zone of influence of the Latin West, while the area in blue shows the eastern Greek part.

Greek and Roman paganism was gradually replaced by Christianity, first with its legalization with the Edict of Milan and then the Edict of Thessalonica which made it the State church of the Roman Empire. Catholic Christianity, served as a unifying force in Christian parts of Europe, and replaced or competed with some secular authorities. The Jewish Christian tradition it had emerged from was all but extinguished, and antisemitism became entrenched in Christendom.

=== The birth of the European West during the Early Middle Ages ===
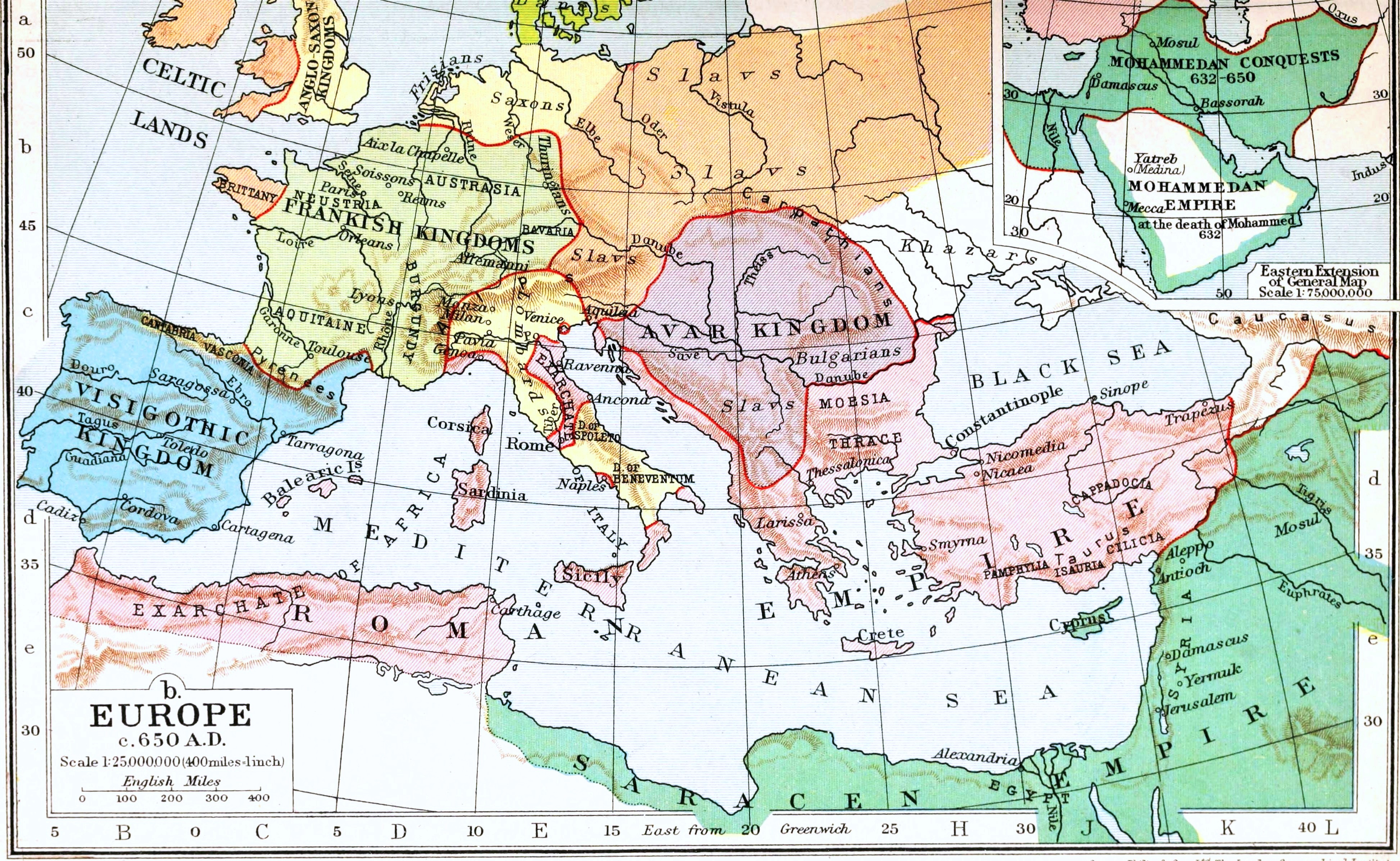
Europe c. 650 AD

Viking expansion in Europe between the 8th and 11th centuries: The yellow colour includes expansions of the Normans

After the fall of Rome, much of Greco-Roman art, literature, science and technology was all but lost in the western part of the old empire. Europe fell into a period of warring kingdoms and principalities now known as the Early Middle Ages (500–1000), marked by a continuation, or even intensification, of the destructive trends of late antiquity: depopulation, deurbanization, and barbarian invasions. From the 7th until the 11th centuries, Muslims, Vikings and Magyars raided and invaded the European peninsula from the south, north, and east.

As Roman imperial governance contracted and the supply of Egyptian papyrus diminished, parchment became the dominant writing material. Its vastly higher cost reinforced the clerical monopoly on literacy, which had declined with the collapse of Roman municipal schools and civic structures that economically rewarded literate administrators. The Catholic Church became the primary source of institutional continuity, legal memory, and administrative expertise for the turbulent post-Roman kingdoms of Western Europe, which were contending with internecine warfare, barbarian raids and invasions, and prolonged economic contraction. The Visigoths, Anglo-Saxons, Lombards, Frisians, Thuringians, and Bavarians converted to Catholicism between 550 and 750 AD but the Umayyad conquest of the Visigothic Kingdom in Iberia — the most organized and legally sophisticated Germanic-Catholic kingdom of the era — left the Kingdom of the Franks ("Francia"), Kingdom of the Lombards (on the Italian Peninsula) and petty Anglo-Saxon kingdoms as the only significant Catholic realms. Among the other long-term effects of this era of Church cultural dominance was the dissolution of traditional European kinship networks.

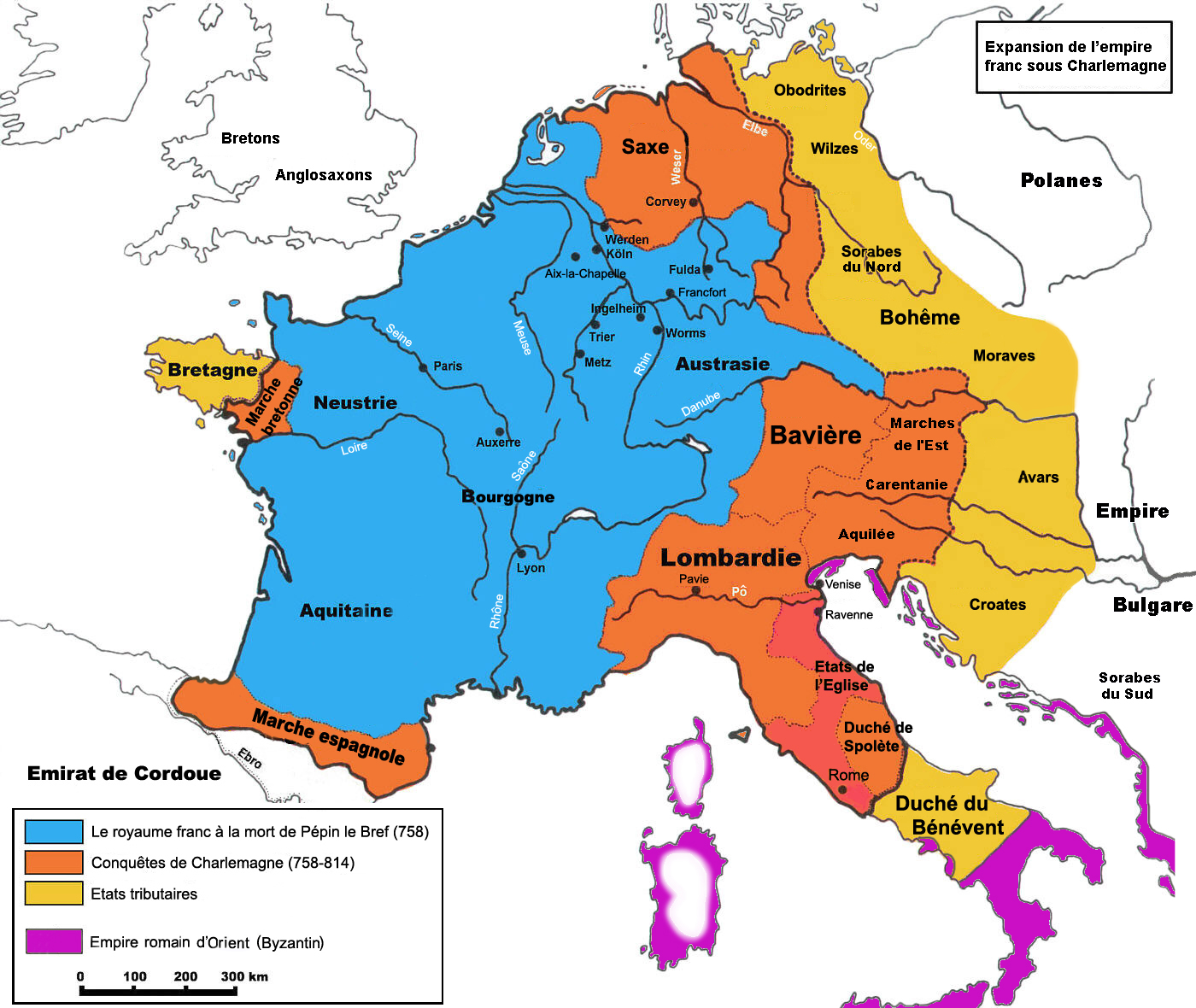
Expansion of the Frankish Empire: realm of Pepin the Short in 758; expansion under Charlemagne until 814; Marches and dependencies; Papal States

In 800, the Frankish king Charlemagne was crowned Emperor by Pope Leo III, the first western Roman emperor since Romulus Augustus. The conflict-filled relationship between the Church and monarchs became the most important political fact of European history for the next 500 years. The stability of Charlemagne's reign stimulated a brief revival of cultural activity known as the Carolingian Renaissance. The earliest recorded concept of Europe as a cultural sphere (instead of simply a geographic term), comprising territories practicing Western Christianity was formed by Alcuin of York in the late 8th century during the reign of Charlemagne.

The rediscovery of the Justinian Code in Western Europe early in the 10th century rekindled a passion for the discipline of law, which crossed many of the re-forming boundaries between East and West. In the Catholic or Frankish west, Roman law became the foundation on which all legal concepts and systems were based, influencing all Western legal systems. The study of canon law, the legal system of the Catholic Church, fused with Roman law became the basis of the refounding of Western legal scholarship.

In 1054 came the Great Schism that, following the Greek East and Latin West divide, separated Europe into religious and cultural regions present to this day.

=== High Middle Ages and Renaissance ===
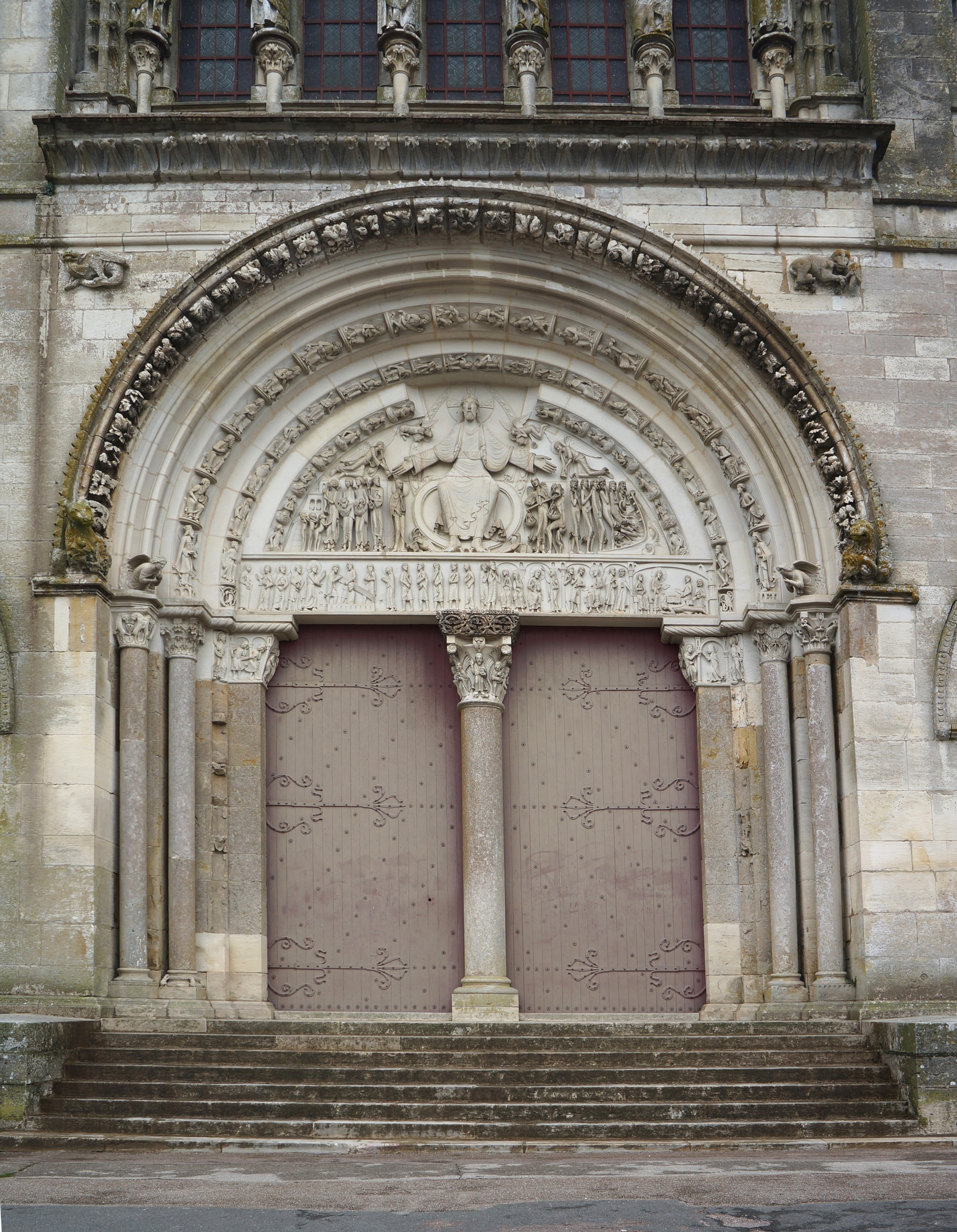
Stone bas-relief of Jesus, from the Vézelay Abbey (Burgundy, France)

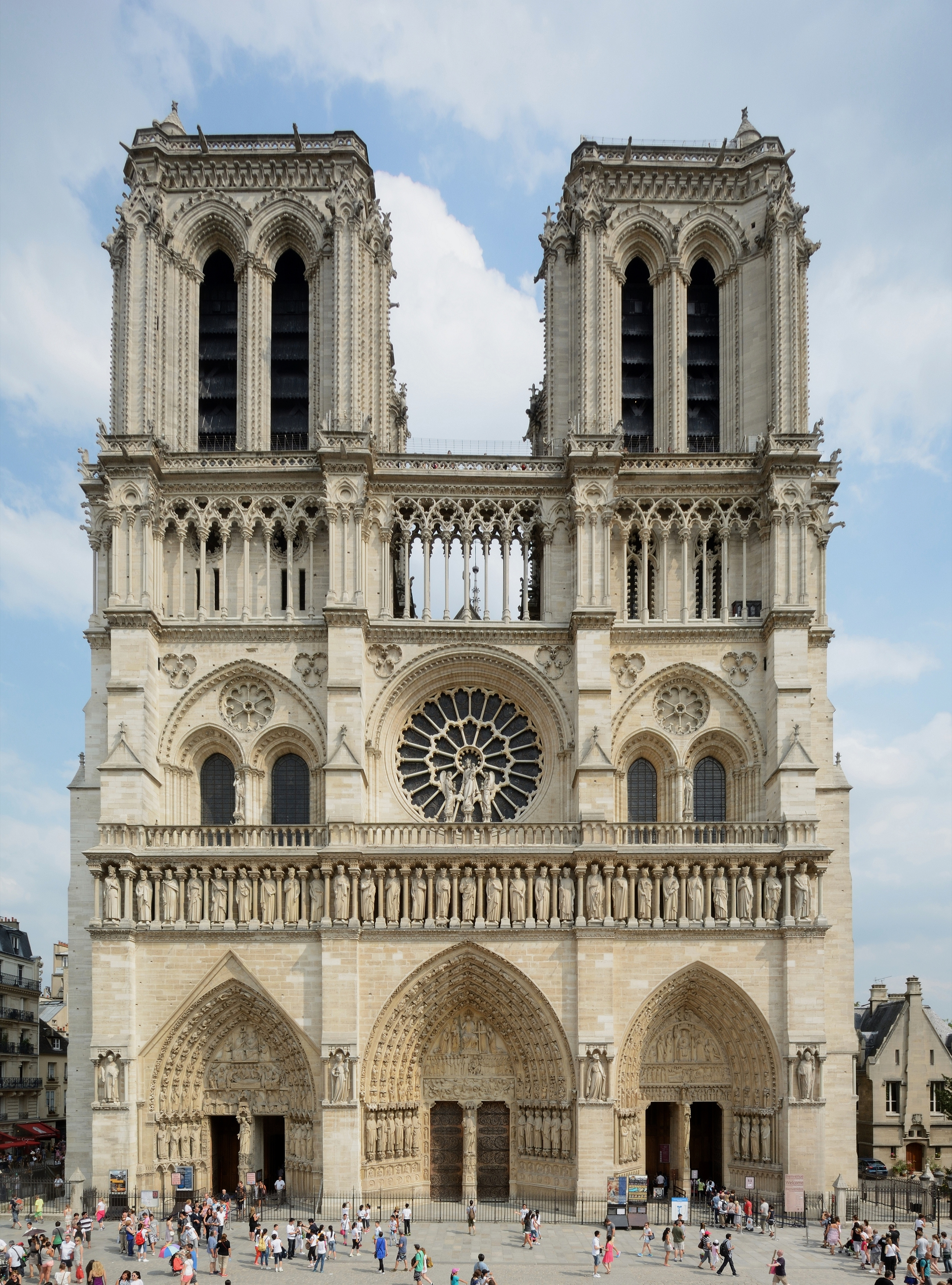
Notre-Dame, in Paris, the most iconic Gothic cathedral, built between 1163 and 1345

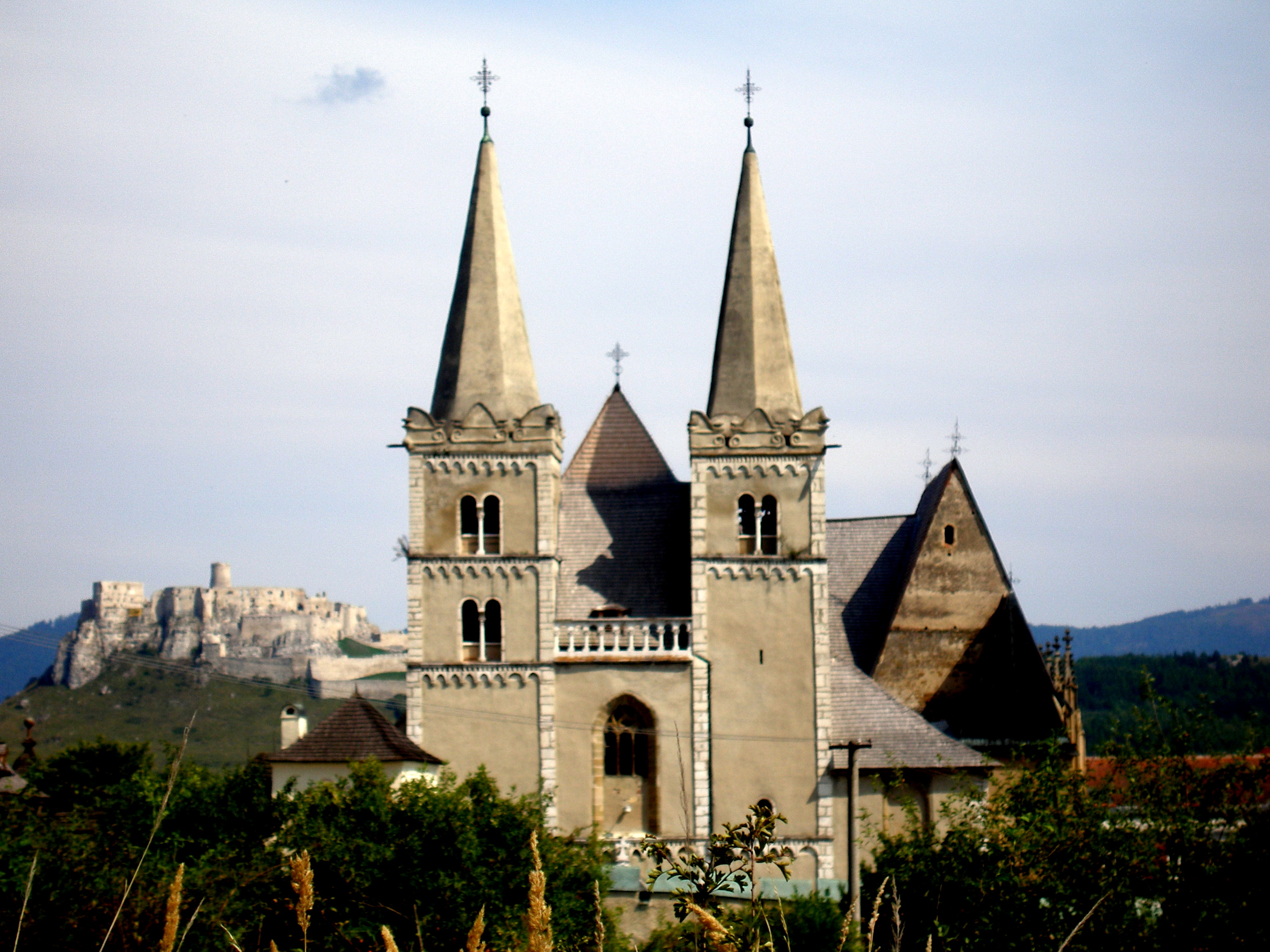
Two main symbols of the medieval Western civilization on one picture: the gothic St. Martin's cathedral in Spišské Podhradie (Slovakia) and the Spiš Castle behind the cathedral

Medieval Christianity is credited with creating the first modern universities. The oldest university currently in continuous operation in the world appeared in the 11th century in Italy (the University of Bologna) and two more were established in the 12th century in France (the University of Paris) and England (the University of Oxford). With Christian culture as the predominant force in Western civilization, the Scholastic movement of the High Middle Ages sought to connect Catholicism with Greek thought. The economist Joseph Schumpeter asserted that medieval Scholastics "come nearer than does any other group to having been the 'founders' of scientific economics." Though lost in the West, many classical Greek texts were translated into Arabic and preserved in the medieval Islamic world. The Greek classics along with Arabic science, philosophy and technology were transmitted to Western Europe and translated into Latin, sparking the Renaissance of the 12th century and 13th century.

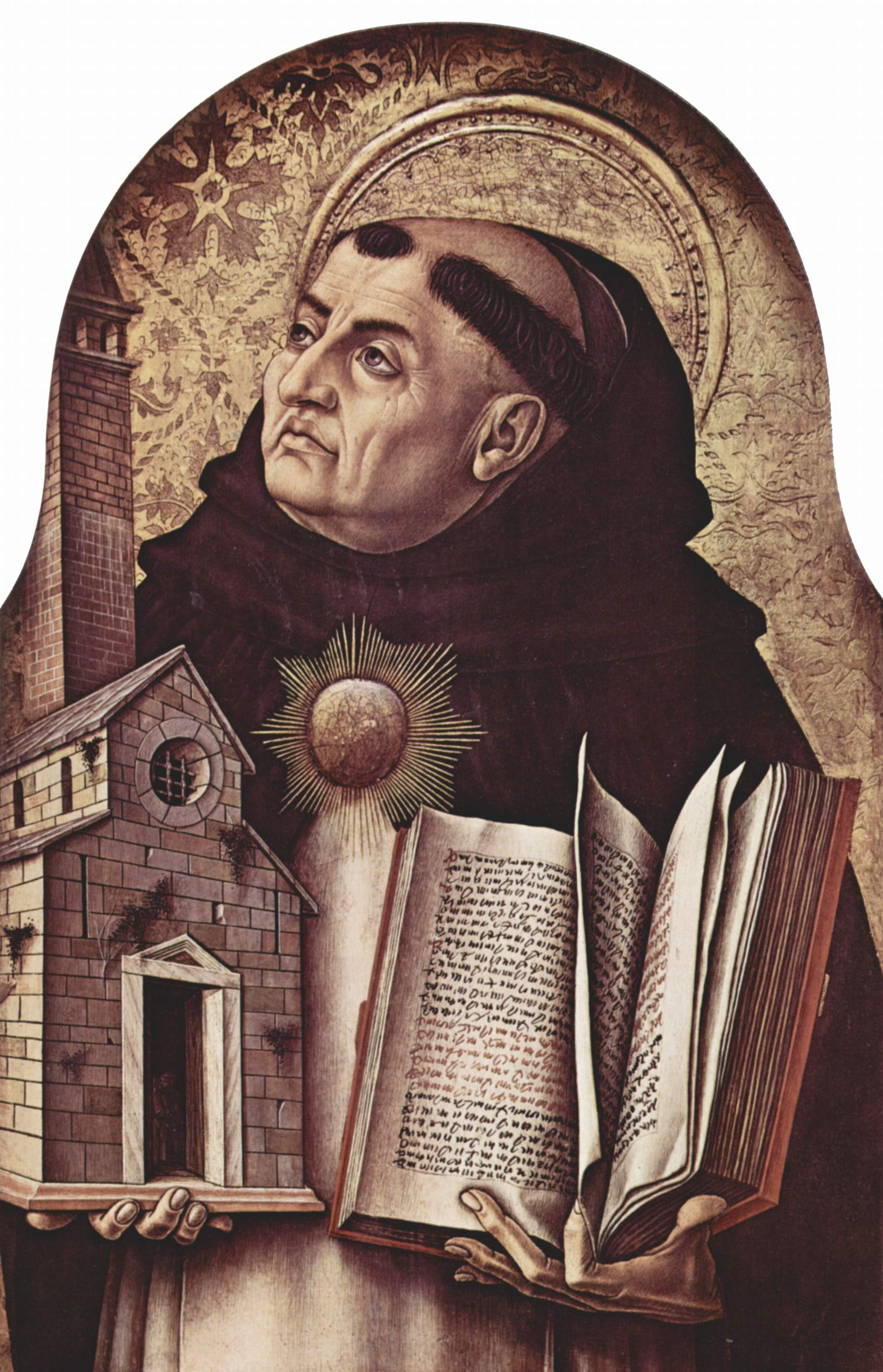
Thomas Aquinas, a Catholic philosopher of the Middle Ages, revived and developed natural law from ancient Greek philosophy.

The Sovereign Military Order of Malta, which today has over 50,000 medical personnel, traces its origins to 1099 AD. The Hospitallers of the Holy Spirit, which at its height operated hundreds of hospitals across Europe, was founded in 1180 AD. Medieval hospitals were established to cater to "social groups marginalized by poverty, sickness, and age," according to the historian and vastly improved upon the Roman valetudinaria and Greek healing temples. Christianity also played a role in ending practices common among pagan societies, such as human sacrifice, slavery, infanticide and polygamy. Francisco de Vitoria, a disciple of Thomas Aquinas and a Catholic thinker who studied the issue regarding the human rights of colonized natives, is recognized by the United Nations as a father of international law, and now also by historians of economics and democracy as a leading light for the West's democracy and rapid economic development.

The 14th century Renaissance, starting from Italy and then spreading throughout Europe, was associated with a massive artistic, architectural and philosophical revival. Renaissance humanism advanced a worldview centered on nature and the importance of humanity, emerging from the study of classical antiquity and influencing philosophy and art for many years. In the following century, this process was enhanced by an exodus of Greek Christian priests and scholars to Italian cities such as Florence and Venice after the fall of Constantinople.

From a single print shop in Mainz, Germany around 1440, printing spread to more than 270 cities in Europe and produced more than 20 million volumes by the end of the 15th century. The technology ended the manuscript culture of the Middle Ages, replacing it with a printing culture. At the same time, the number of universities exceeded 60.

=== Early modern era ===
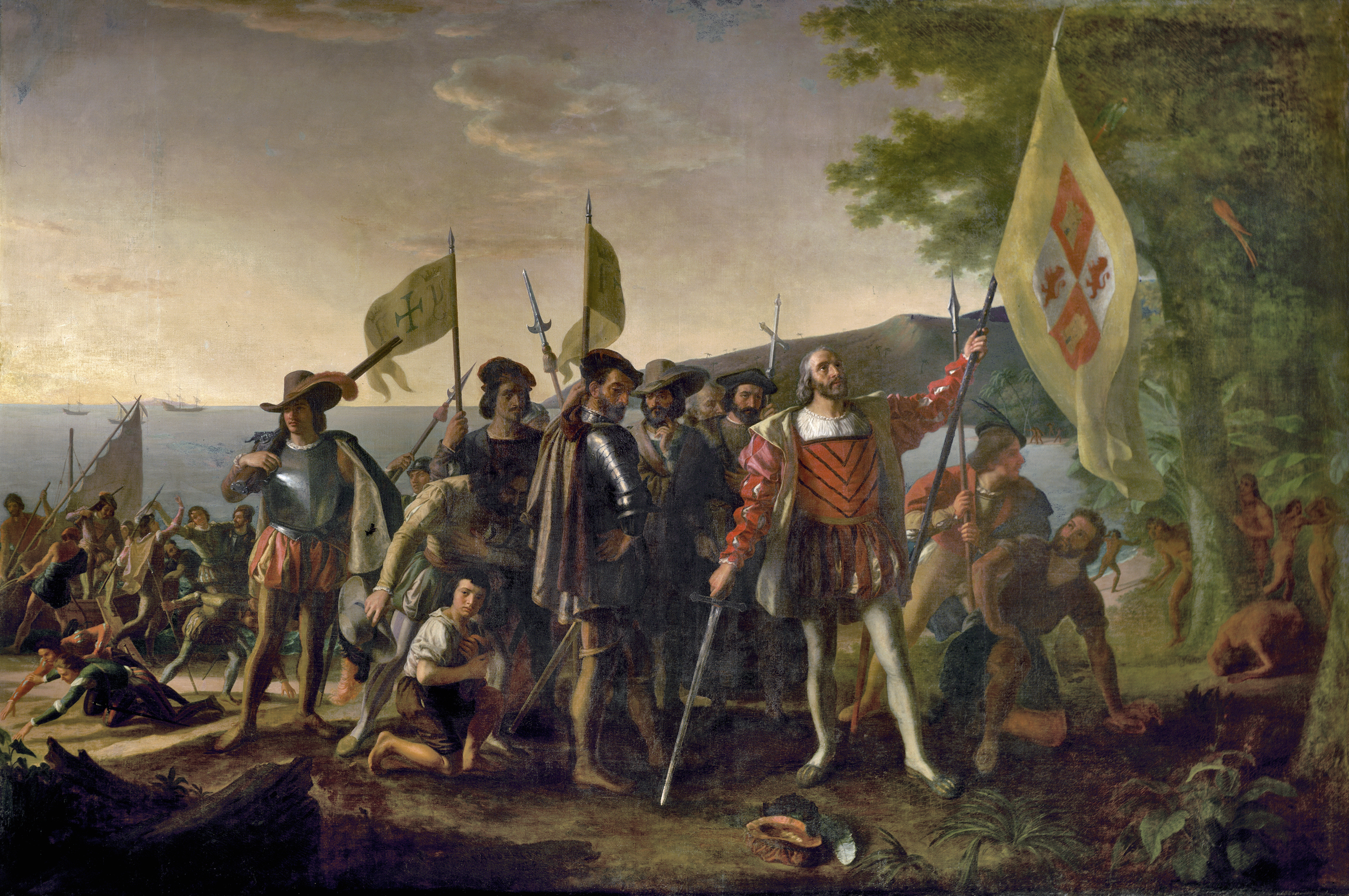
Christopher Columbus arrives at the New World.

By 1500 — two centuries before the Industrial Revolution and a century before the Scientific Revolution — Europe's technology and advanced political and economic organization "[gave] it a decisive edge over all other civilizations on earth." European navigators achieved the first circumnavigation of Earth at the beginning of the 16th century, including the first crossing of the Pacific. During the Age of Discovery, every continent except Antarctica was visited and mapped by Europeans.

Sparked by Martin Luther’s Ninety-five Theses (1517) and spread by the new movable type printing press in vernacular languages (i.e. not Latin), the Protestant Reformation was a religious and political challenge to the papacy and the authority of the Catholic Church hierarchy. As the movement branched into Lutheranism, Calvinism, and Anglicanism, it triggered the Catholic Counter-Reformation and reshaped Europe’s political landscape. The upheaval of the Reformation exploded into nearly two centuries of religious wars — the most devastating European conflicts until the 20th century — and resulted in millions of deaths, especially in Germany, where over a third of the population perished from conflict, disease and famine.

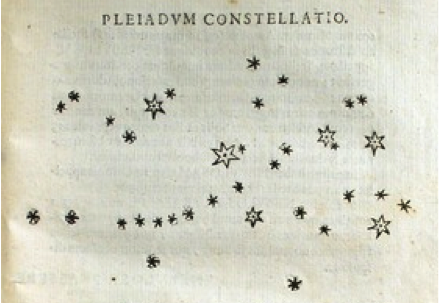
Galileo reported in the Starry Messenger (1610) that he saw at least ten times more stars through the telescope than are visible to the naked eye.

Galileo Galilei’s early 17th-century telescopic observations began the transformation of what had been a narrowly technical revision of classical astronomy by Nicolaus Copernicus into an increasingly aggressive challenge to traditional cosmology and the long-standing synthesis of Aristotelian physics and Christian theology. The upheaval of the Scientific Revolution ended the medieval view of natural philosophy as secondary to theology. As natural philosophy grew in power and independence during the 17th century, European society began to dramatically change intellectual attitude — from fides quaerens intellectum to a new mode of understanding that was decoupled from religion. The "New Science" that emerged by the end of the century broke sharply with the natural philosophy that had preceded it, departed from previous Greek conceptions and traditions, was more mechanistic in its worldview and more integrated with mathematics, and was obsessed with the acquisition and interpretation of new evidence.

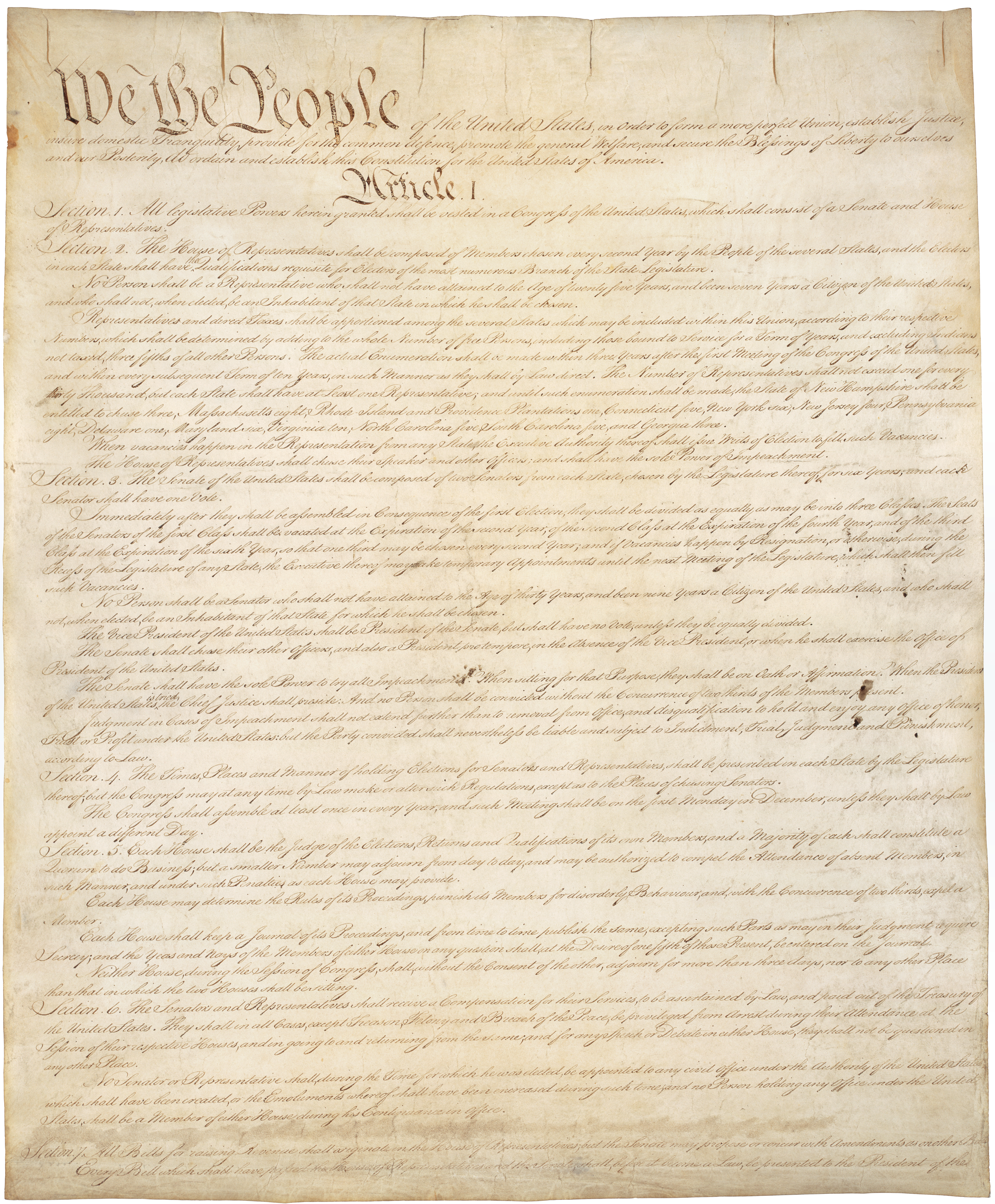
The United States Constitution

During the Age of Enlightenment of the 18th century, cultural and intellectual forces in European society emphasized reason, analysis, and individualism rather than traditional authority. It challenged the authority of deeply rooted social institutions, such as the Catholic Church. Social reforms promoting toleration, science and skepticism became popular. Philosophers of the Enlightenment included John Locke, Baruch Spinoza, Voltaire (1694–1778), Jean-Jacques Rousseau, David Hume, and Immanuel Kant, who influenced society by publishing widely read works. Some rulers met with intellectuals and applied reforms, such as allowing for toleration, or accepting multiple religions, in what became known as enlightened absolutism. New ideas and beliefs spread around Europe, fostered by increased literacy made possible by an emergence of non-religious publishing. Notable publications include Encyclopédie (1751–72) edited by Denis Diderot and Jean le Rond d'Alembert, and the Dictionnaire philosophique (1764) and Letters on the English (1733) by Voltaire.

=== Industrial Revolution ===
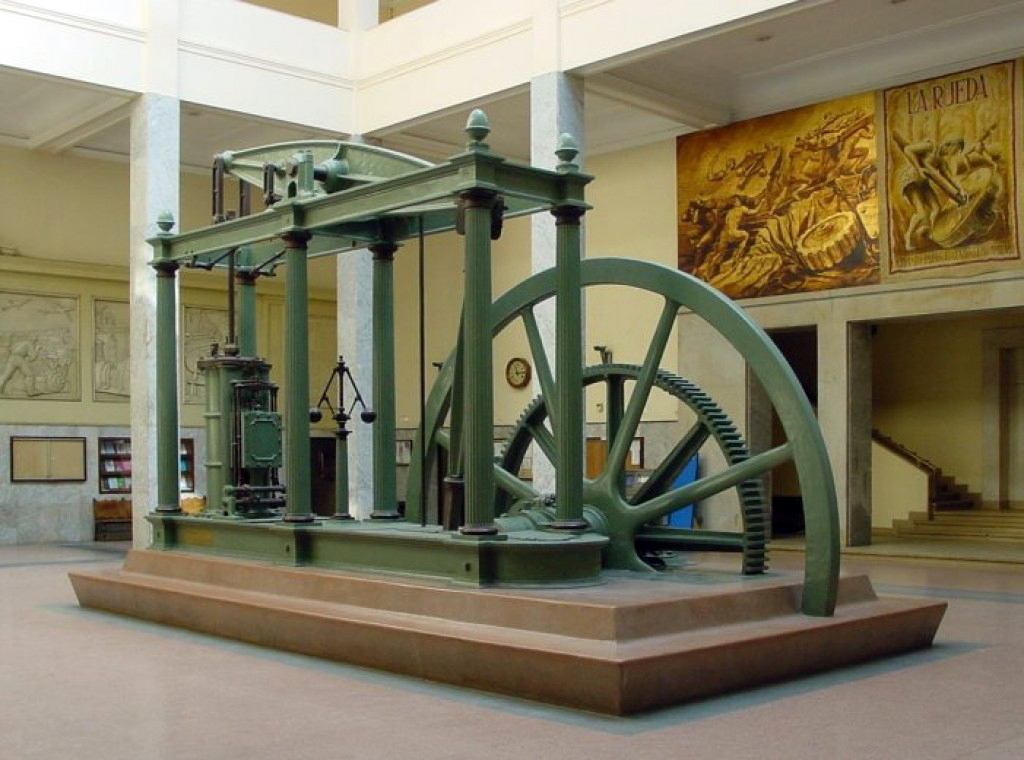
A Watt steam engine. The steam engine, made of iron and fueled primarily by coal, propelled the Industrial Revolution in Great Britain and the world.

During the Great Divergence, the Western world overcame pre-modern growth constraints and emerged during the 19th century as the most powerful and wealthy world civilization, eclipsing Qing China, Mughal India, Tokugawa Japan, and the Ottoman Empire. European states colonized most of the planet; only thirteen present-day independent countries escaped formal colonization by European powers. There are many theories to explain the Great Divergence, including lack of government intervention, high bridging social capital, geography, colonialism, and customary traditions.

The Industrial Revolution was the transition to new manufacturing processes in the period from about 1760 to sometime between 1820 and 1840. This included transitions from hand production methods to machines, new chemical manufacturing and iron production processes, more efficient water power, increased use of steam power, and the development of machine tools. These transitions began in Great Britain and spread to Western Europe and North America within a few decades.

The Industrial Revolution marks a major turning point in history; almost every aspect of daily life was influenced. In particular, average income and population began to exhibit unprecedented sustained growth. Some economists say that the major impact of the Industrial Revolution was that the standard of living for the general population began to increase consistently for the first time in history, although others have said that it did not begin to meaningfully improve until the late 19th and 20th centuries while the Maddison Project argues that GDP per capita in Western Europe had diverged at least as early as 1400. The precise start and end of the Industrial Revolution is still debated among historians, as is the pace of economic and social changes. Economic historians agree that the onset of the Industrial Revolution is the most important event in human history since the domestication of animals, plants and fire.

The First Industrial Revolution evolved into the Second Industrial Revolution in the transition years between 1840 and 1870, when technological and economic progress continued with the adoption of steam transport (steam-powered railways, boats, and ships), large-scale manufacture of machine tools and increased use of machinery in steam-powered factories.

=== Post-Industrial era ===
Tendencies that have come to define modern Western societies include the concept of political pluralism, individualism, prominent subcultures or countercultures (such as New Age movements) and increasing cultural syncretism resulting from globalization and immigration. Western culture has been heavily influenced by the Renaissance, the Ages of Discovery and Enlightenment and the Industrial and Scientific Revolutions.

In the 20th century, Christianity declined in influence in many Western countries, mostly in the European Union where most member states have experienced falling church attendance and membership. Secularism, the separation of religion from politics and science increased. Christianity remains the dominant religion in the Western world, where 70% are Christians.

The West went through a series of great cultural and social changes between 1945 and 1980. Mass media including film, radio, television and recorded music created a global culture that could ignore national frontiers. Literacy became almost universal, encouraging the growth of books, magazines and newspapers. The influence of cinema and radio remained, while televisions became near essentials in every home.

By the mid-20th century, Western culture was exported worldwide, and the development and growth of international transport and telecommunication such as the transatlantic cable and radiotelephone played a decisive role in modern globalization. The West has contributed to Catholicism, Protestantism, democracy, industrialisation, and is the first major civilization to seek to abolish slavery during the 19th century.

In the late 20th and early 21st centuries, the definition of the Western Culture solidified around institutional membership in the European Union and NATO, which serve as the primary geopolitical and security anchors of Western identity. For Central European nations, the fall of the Iron Curtain in 1989 represented a "return to Europe," reclaiming a historical identity rooted in Latin Christendom and Enlightenment values that had been suppressed during 42 years of Cold War. Historians like Samuel Huntington classify Russia as the "core state" of a distinct Orthodox civilization, separated from the West by a centuries-old cultural "fault line". Some scholars trace Russia's autocratic tradition to the Mongol conquest, which isolated Muscovy from Europe for centuries and ingrained a model of absolute, centralized power and collective submission that never existed in the West.

Contemporary consensus defines Western culture not just by geography, but by a commitment to liberal democratic governance, the rule of law, and collective security. Participation in these international organizations is widely viewed as the definitive marker of a state's alignment with Western values, emphasizing a shared responsibility for stability and human rights.

== Arts and humanities ==
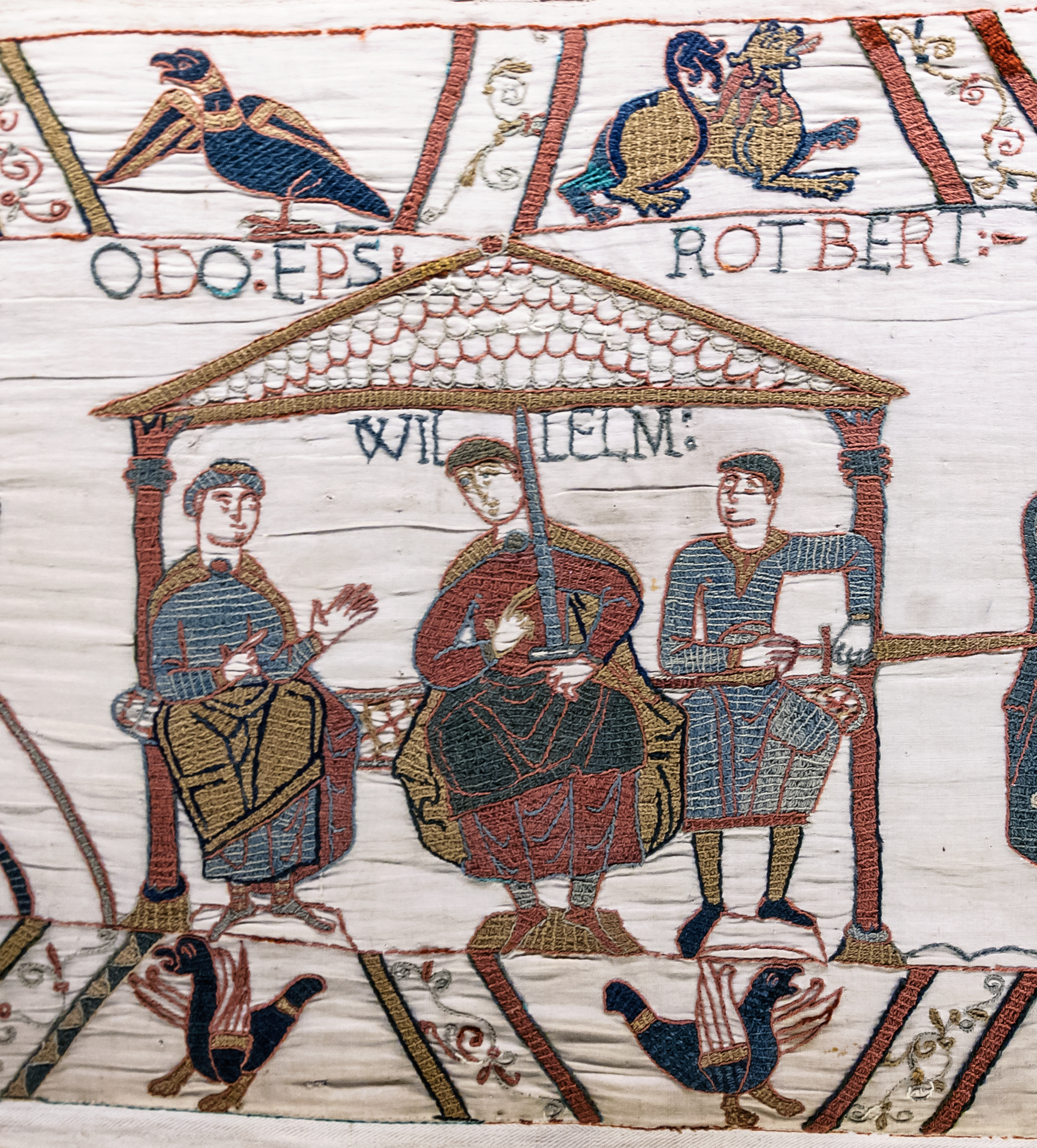
Detail of the Bayeux Tapestry showing William the Conqueror (centre), his half-brothers Robert, Count of Mortain (right) and Odo, Bishop of Bayeux in the Duchy of Normandy (left). The Bayeux tapestry is one of the supreme achievements of the Norman Romanesque.

=== Music ===
Catholic monks developed the first forms of modern Western musical notation to standardize liturgy throughout the worldwide Church, and an enormous body of religious music has been composed for it through the ages. This led directly to the emergence and development of European classical music and its many derivatives. The Baroque style, which encompassed music, art, and architecture, was particularly encouraged by the post-Reformation Catholic Church as such forms offered a means of religious expression that was stirring and emotional, intended to stimulate religious fervor.

The symphony, concerto, sonata, opera, and oratorio have their origins in Italy. Many musical instruments developed in the West have come to see widespread use all over the world; among them are the guitar, violin, piano, pipe organ, saxophone, trombone, clarinet, accordion, and the theremin. In turn, it has been claimed that some European instruments have roots in earlier Eastern instruments that were adopted from the medieval Islamic world. The solo piano, symphony orchestra, and the string quartet are also significant musical innovations of the West.

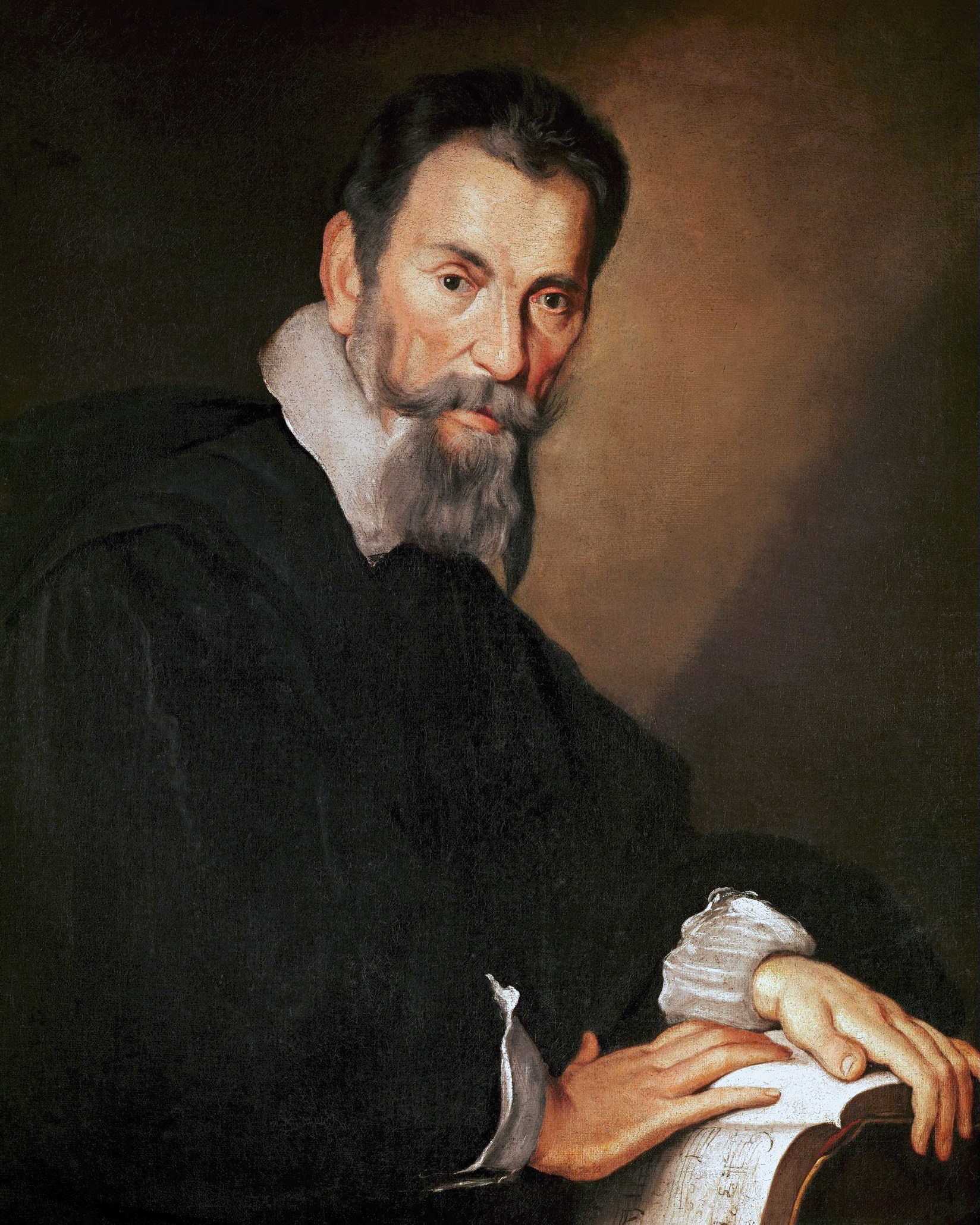
Claudio Monteverdi, 1567–1643

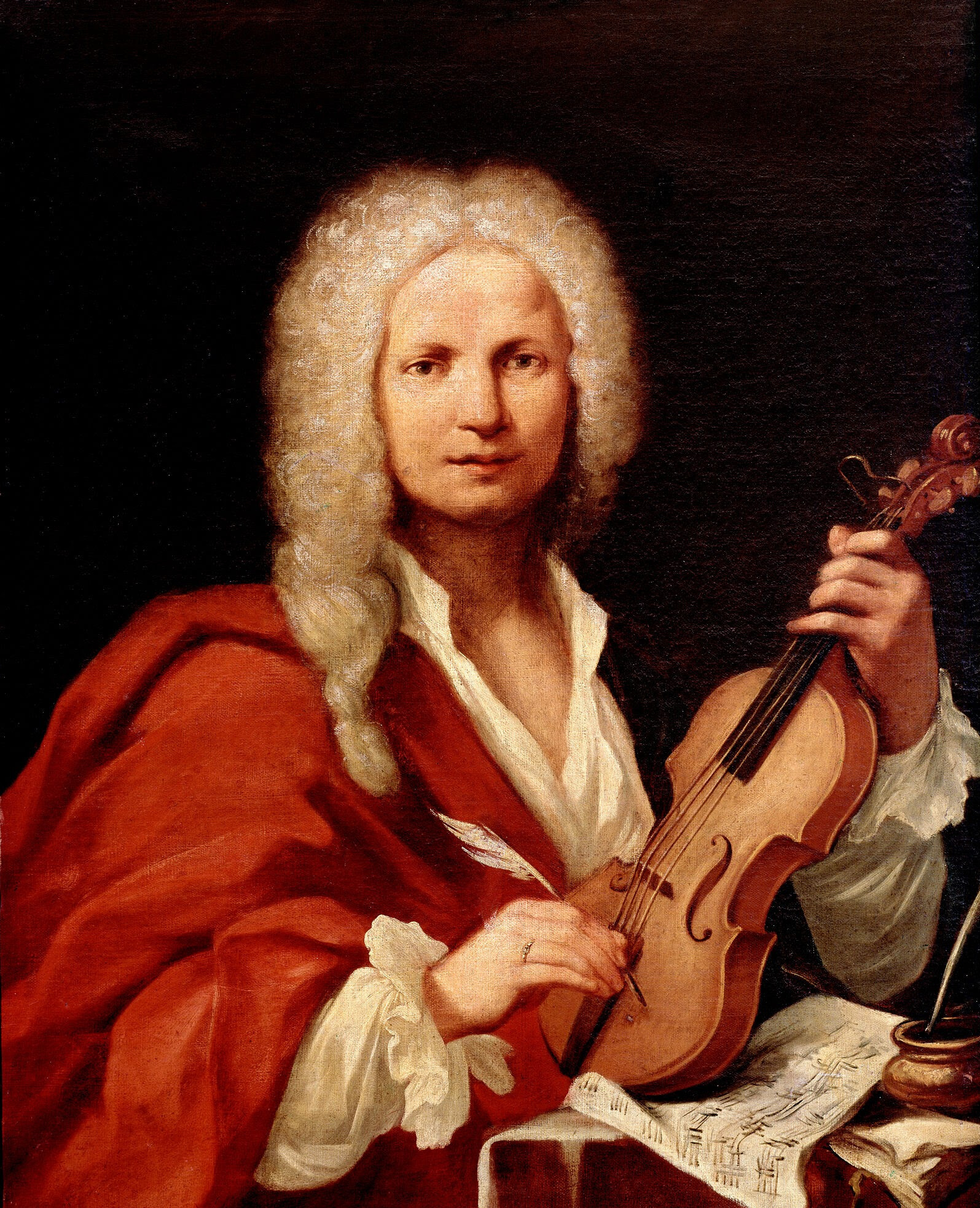
Antonio Lucio Vivaldi, 1678–1741

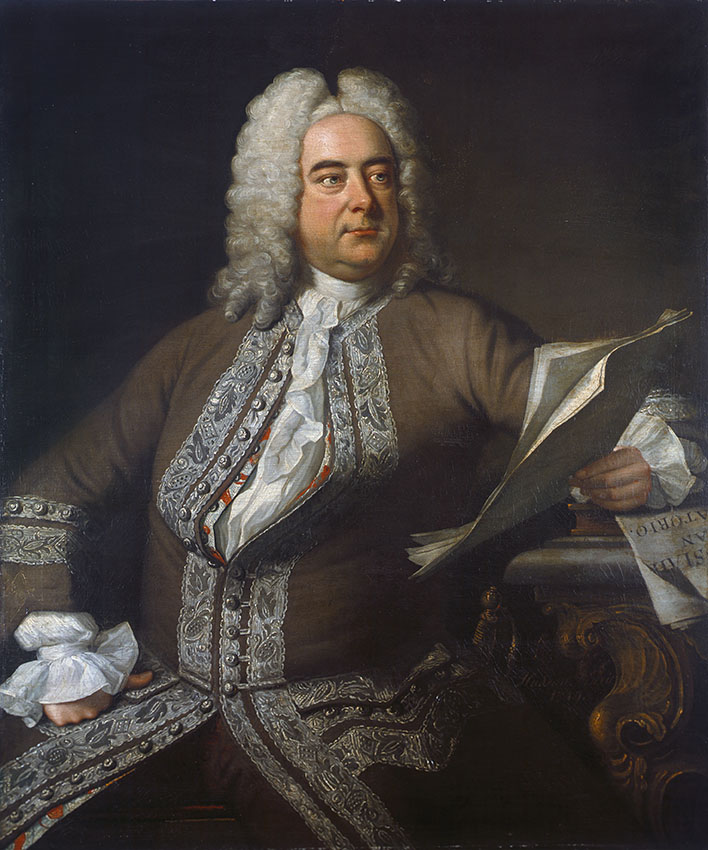
George Frideric Handel, 1685–1759

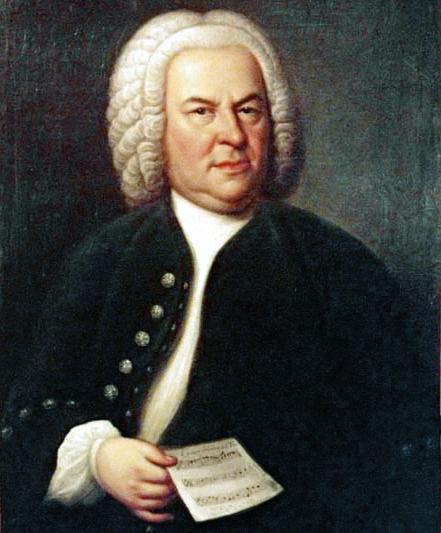
Johann Sebastian Bach, 1685–1750

Franz Joseph Haydn, 1732–1809

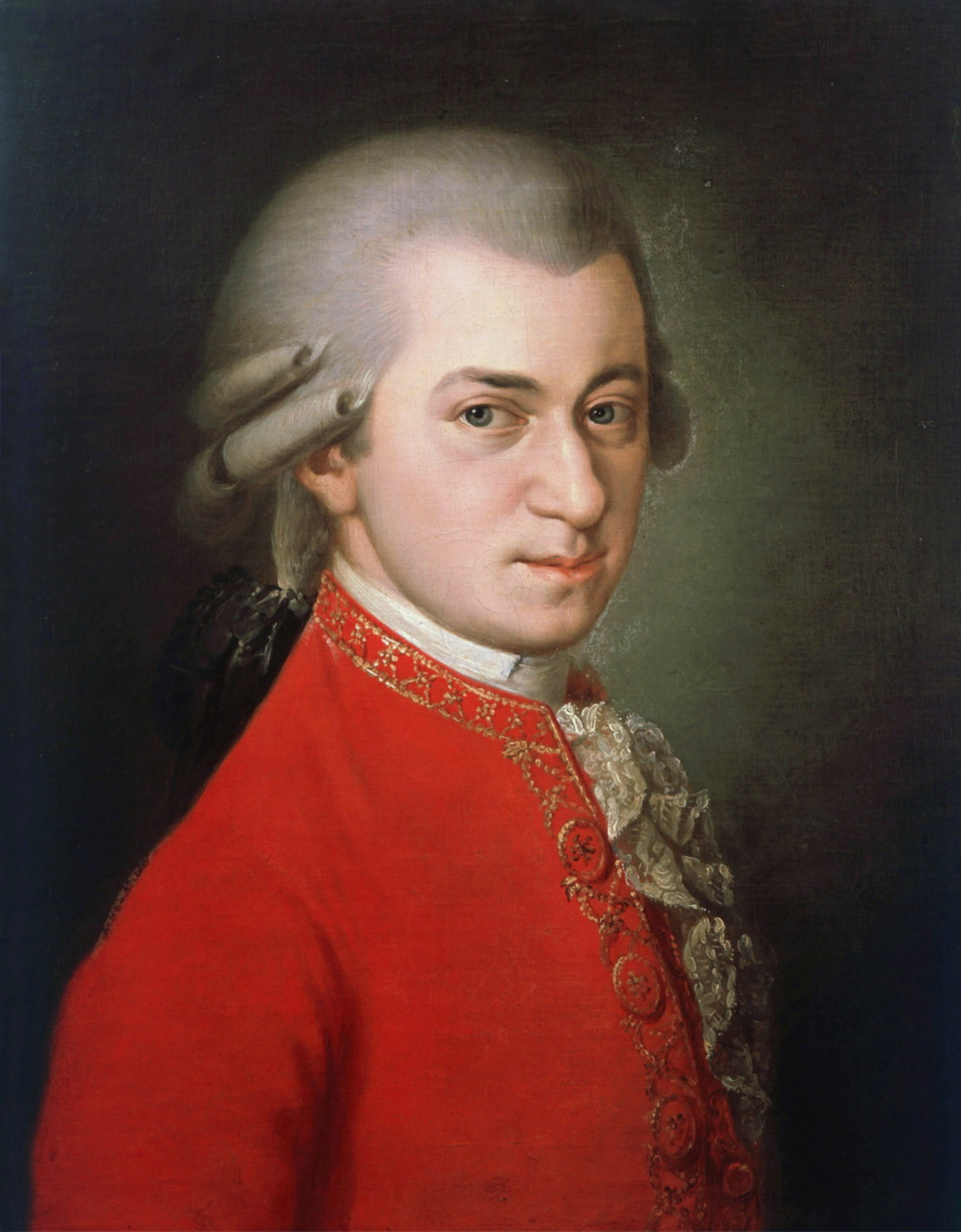
Wolfgang Amadeus Mozart, 1756–1791

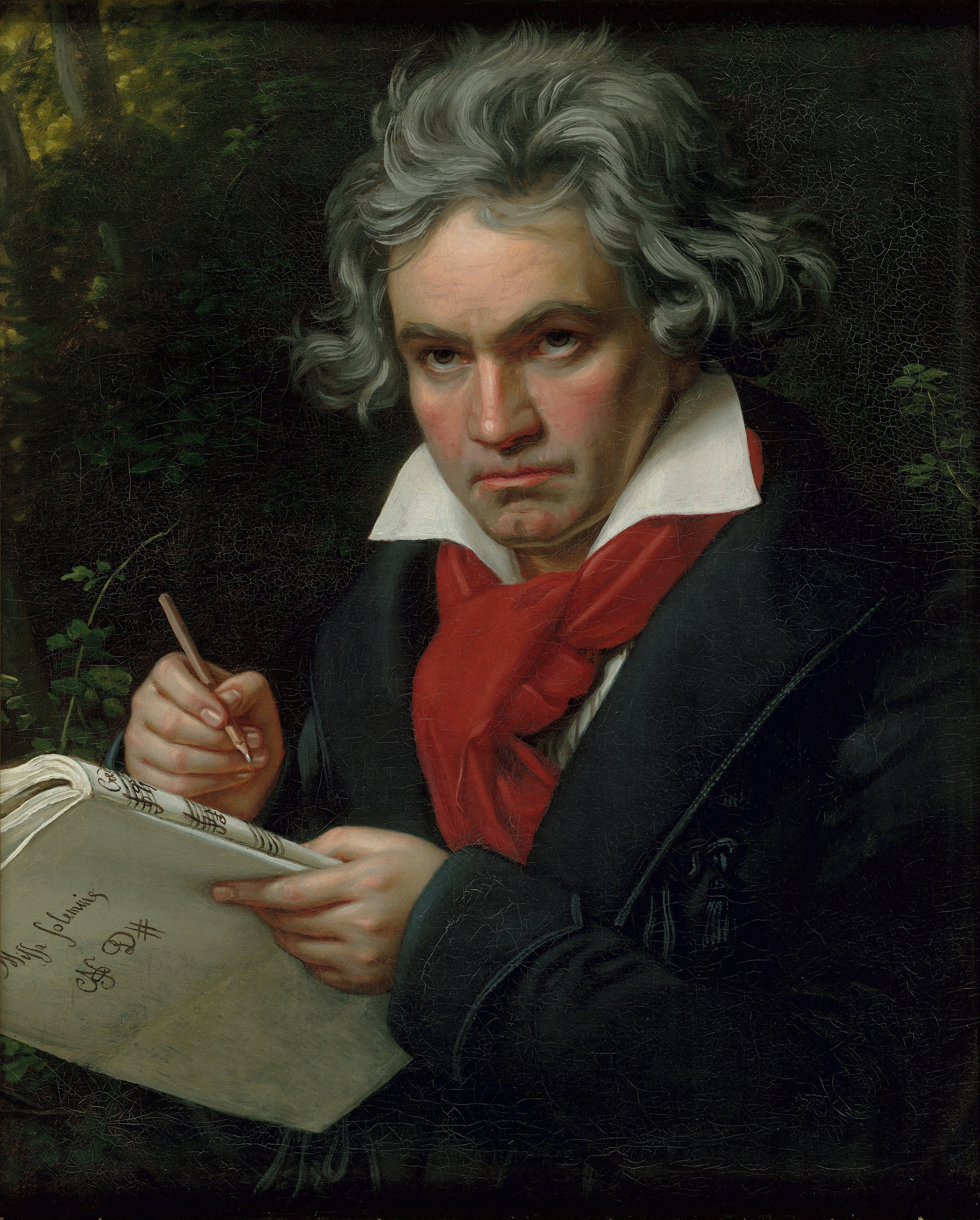
Ludwig van Beethoven, 1770–1827

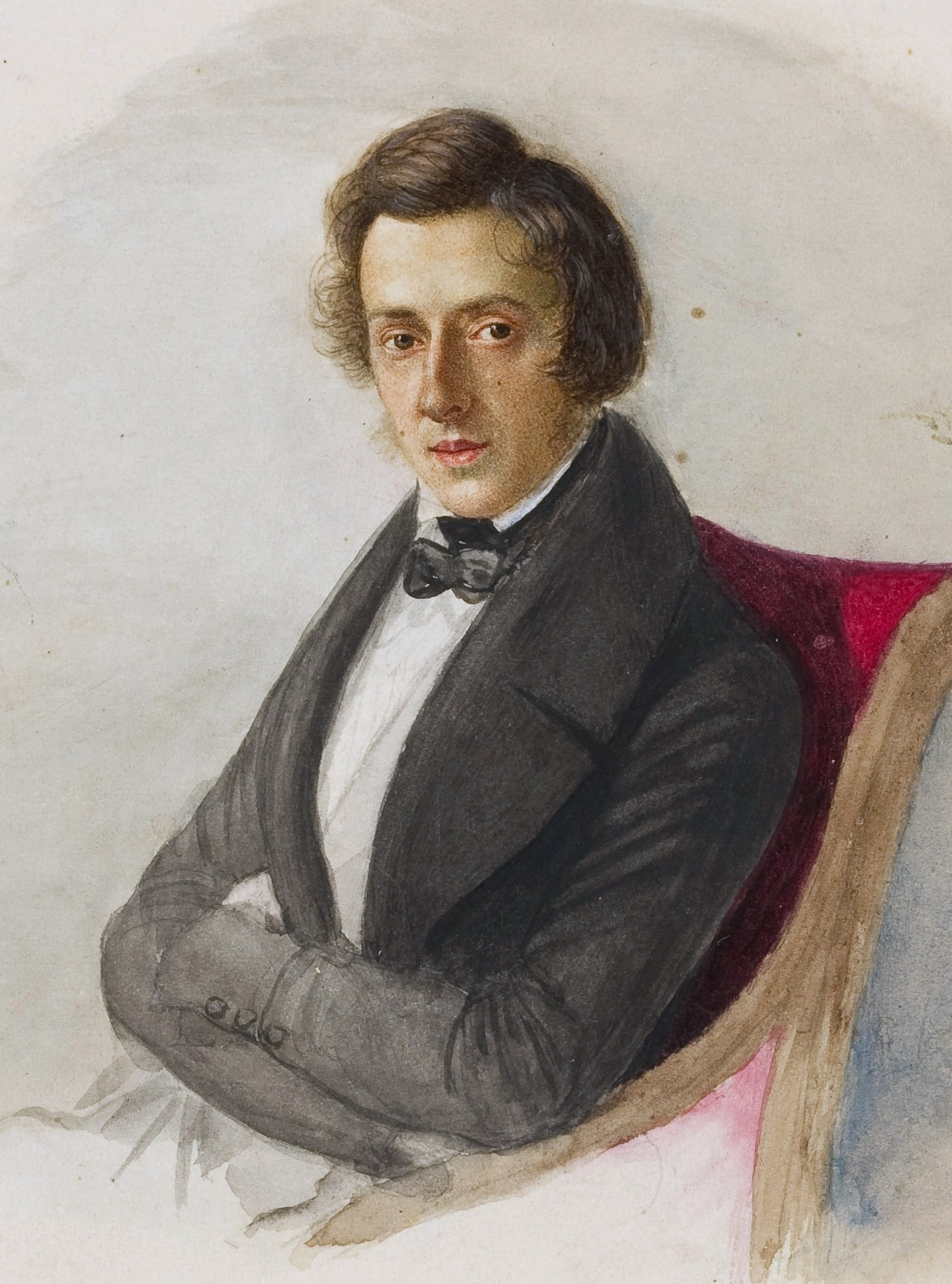
Frédéric François Chopin, 1810–1849

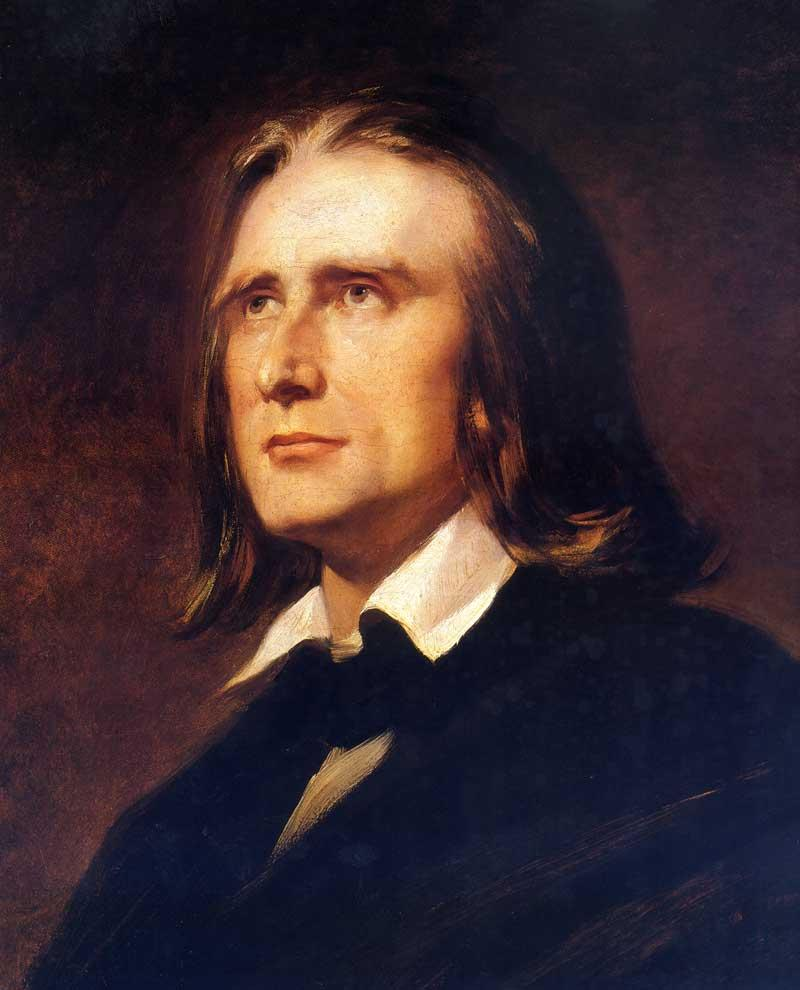
Franz Liszt, 1811–1886

=== Painting and photography ===
Jan van Eyck, among other renaissance painters, made great advances in oil painting, and perspective drawings and paintings had their earliest practitioners in Florence. In art, the Celtic knot is a very distinctive Western repeated motif. Depictions of the nude human male and female in photography, painting, and sculpture are frequently considered to have special artistic merit. Realistic portraiture is especially valued.

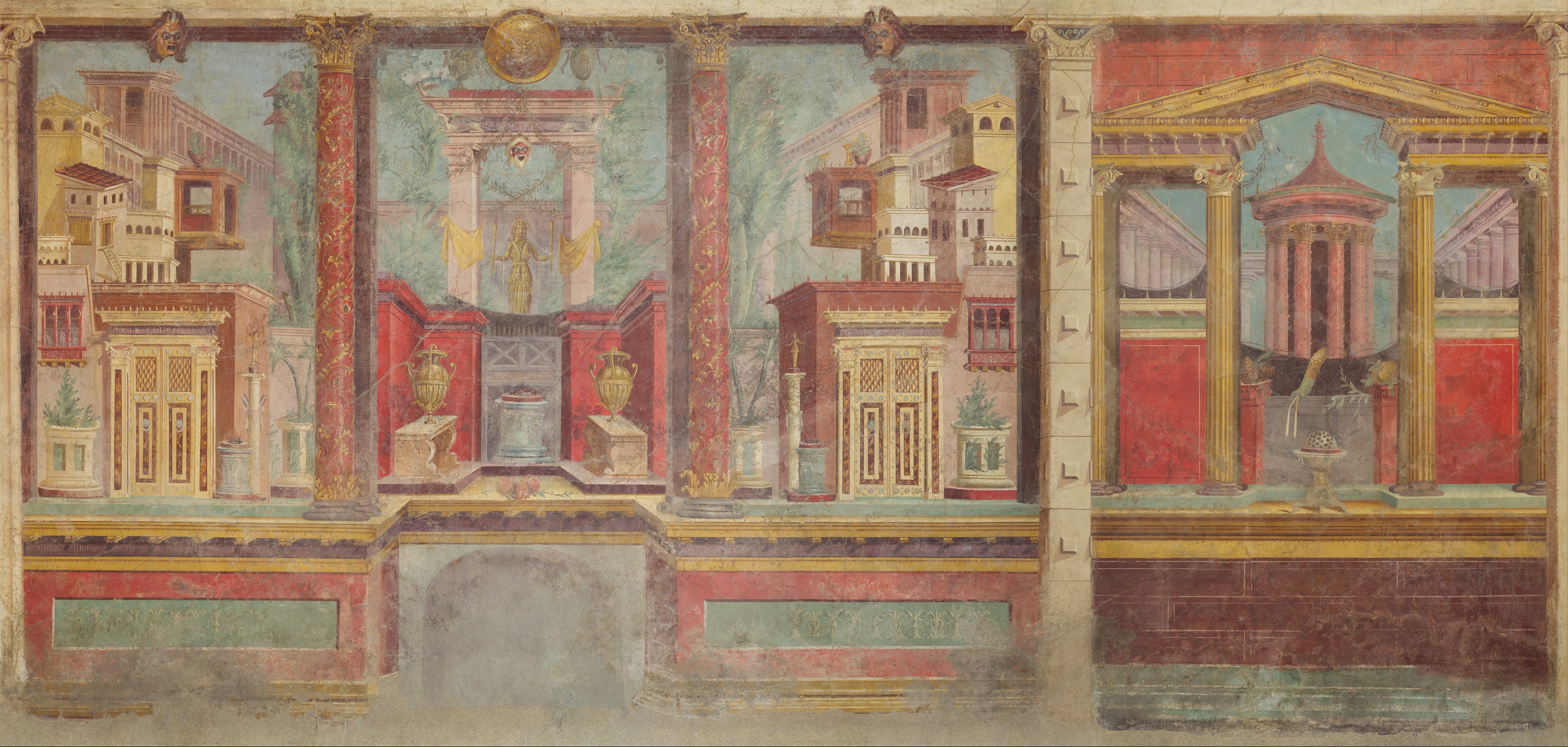
Restoration of a fresco from an Ancient Roman villa bedroom, circa 50–40 BC, dimensions of the room: 265.4 × 334 × 583.9 cm, in the Metropolitan Museum of Art (New York City)

Mona Lisa, by Leonardo da Vinci, c. 1503–1506, perhaps continuing until circa 1517, oil on poplar panel, 77 cm × 53 cm, Louvre (Paris)

Las Meninas, by Diego Velázquez, 1656, oil on canvas, 318 cm × 276 cm, El Prado (Madrid)

Dance at Le moulin de la Galette, by Pierre-Auguste Renoir, 1876, oil on canvas, height: 131 cm, Musée d'Orsay (Paris)

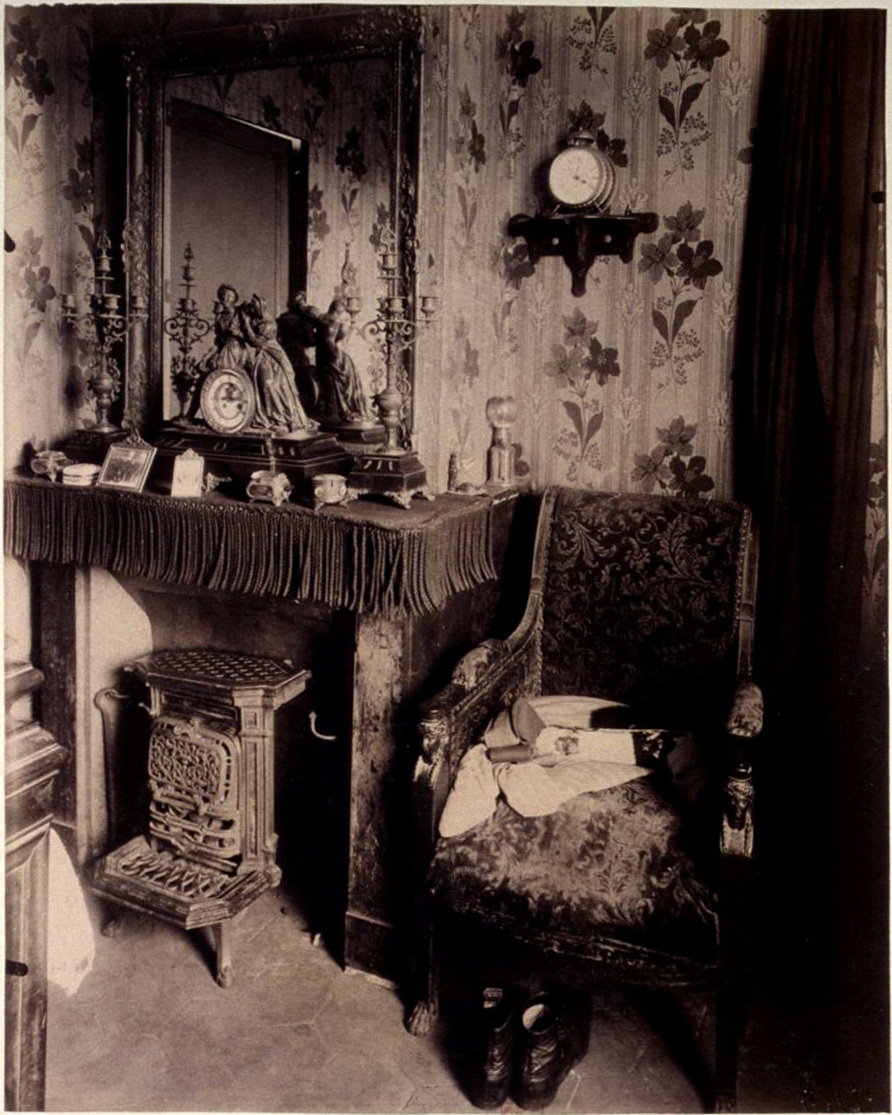
Photo of the interior of the apartment of Eugène Atget, taken in 1910 in Paris

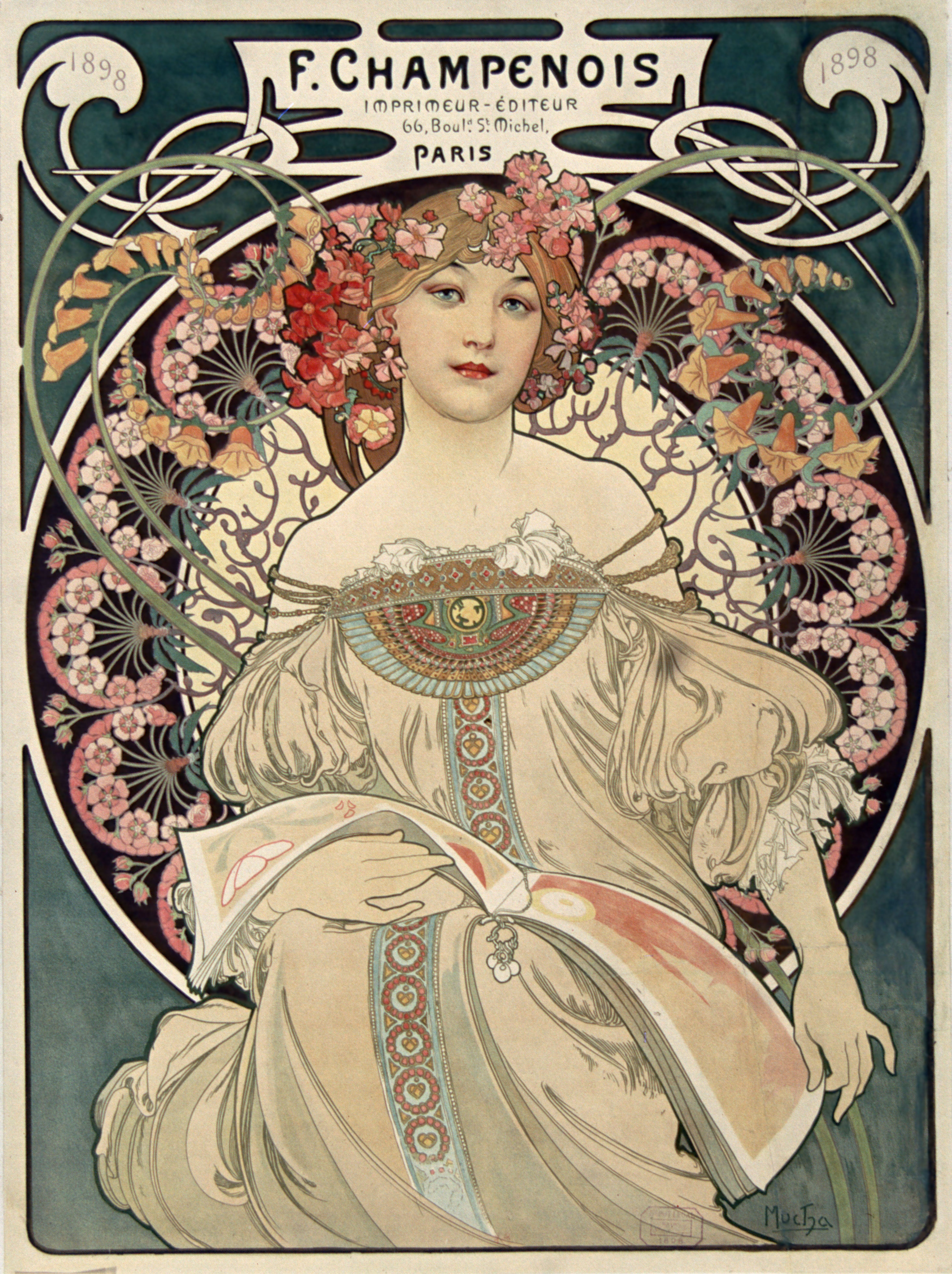
Rêverie, by Alphonse Mucha, poster for the publishing house Champenois (1897)

=== Dance and performing arts ===
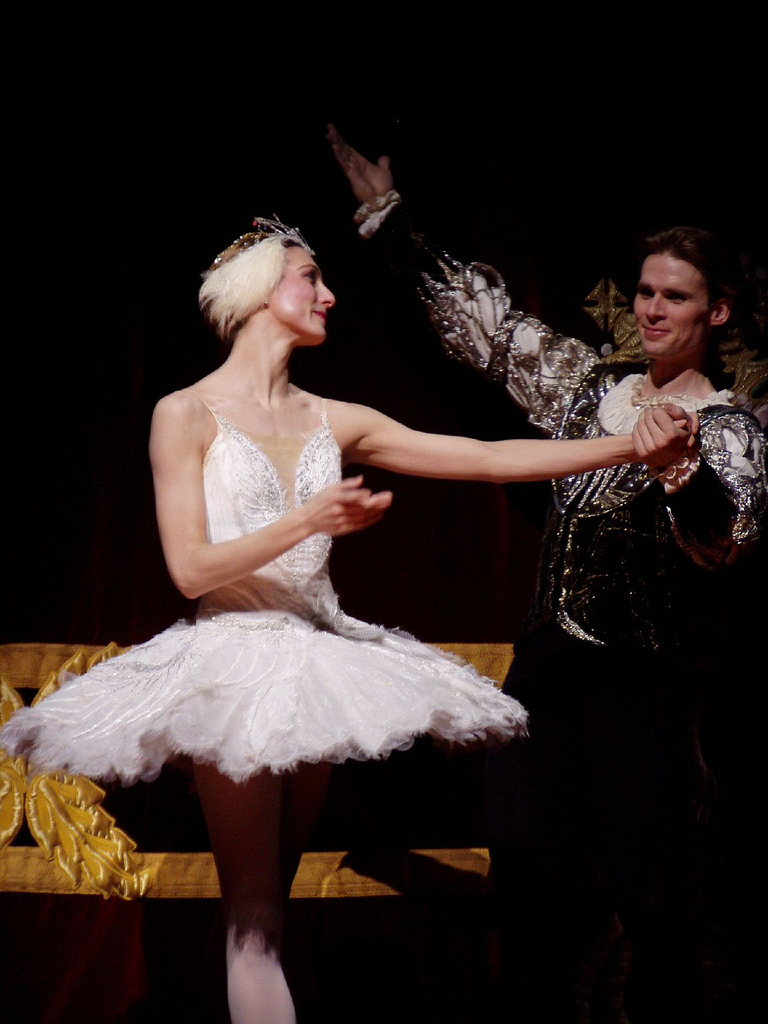
Classical music, opera and ballet: Swan Lake pictured

The ballet is a distinctively Western form of performance dance. The ballroom dance is an important Western variety of dance for the elite. The polka, the square dance, the flamenco,(which however has been long been framed in Orientalist frameworks) and the Irish step dance are very well known Western forms of folk dance.

Greek and Roman theatre are considered the antecedents of modern theatre, and forms such as medieval theatre, Passion Plays, morality plays, and commedia dell'arte are considered highly influential. Elizabethan theatre, with playwrights including William Shakespeare, Christopher Marlowe, and Ben Jonson, is considered one of the most formative and important eras for modern drama.

The soap opera, a popular culture dramatic form, originated in the United States first on radio in the 1930s, then a couple of decades later on television. The music video was also developed in the West in the middle of the 20th century. Musical theatre was developed in the West in the 19th and 20th Centuries, from music hall, comic opera, and Vaudeville; with significant contributions from the Jewish diaspora, African-Americans, and other marginalized peoples.

=== Literature ===
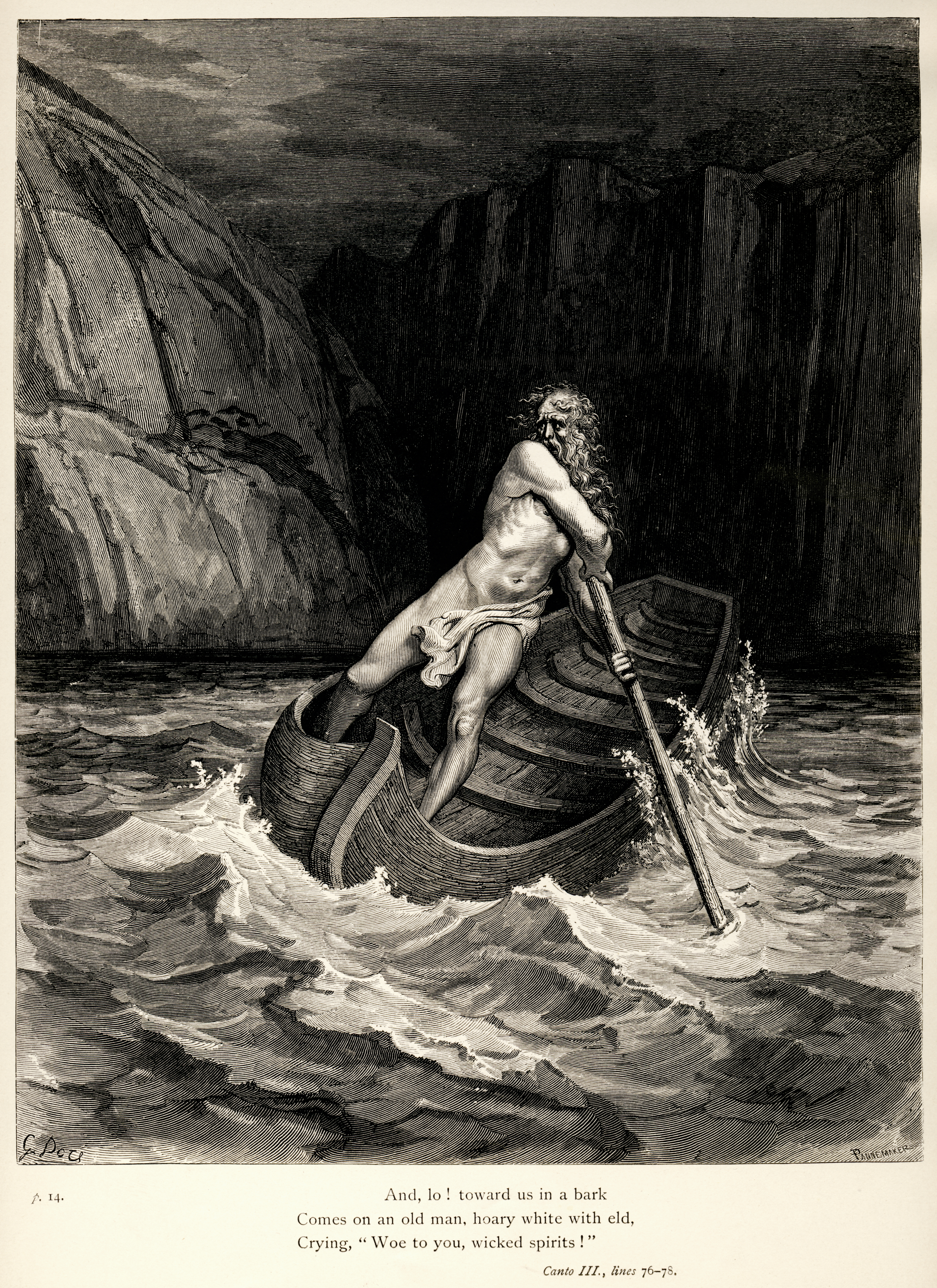
The Divine Comedy is an epic poem by Dante Alighieri. Engraving by Gustave Doré.

Western literature encompasses the literary traditions of Europe, as well as North America, Oceania and Latin America.

While epic literary works in verse such as Beowulf and Homer's Iliad are ancient and occurred worldwide, the prose novel as a distinct form of storytelling, with developed, consistent human characters and, typically, some connected overall plot (although both of these characteristics have sometimes been modified and played with in later times), was popularized by the West in the 17th and 18th centuries. Of course, extended prose fiction had existed much earlier; both novels of adventure and romance in the Hellenistic world and in Heian Japan. Both Petronius' Satyricon (c. 60 CE) and the Tale of Genji by Murasaki Shikibu (c. 1000 CE) have been cited as the world's first major novel but they had a very limited long-term impact on literary writing beyond their own day until much more recent times.

Tragedy, from its ritually and mythologically inspired Greek origins to modern forms where struggle and downfall are often rooted in psychological or social, rather than mythical, motives, is also widely considered a specifically European creation and can be seen as a forerunner of some aspects of both the novel and of classical opera.

=== Architecture ===
Important Western architectural motifs include the Doric, Corinthian, and Ionic orders of Greek architecture, and the Romanesque, Gothic, Renaissance, Baroque, and Victorian styles, which are still widely recognized and used in contemporary Western architecture. Much of Western architecture emphasizes repetition of simple motifs, straight lines and expansive, undecorated planes. A modern ubiquitous architectural form that emphasizes this characteristic is the skyscraper, their modern equivalent first developed in New York and Chicago. The predecessor of the skyscraper can be found in the medieval towers erected in Bologna.

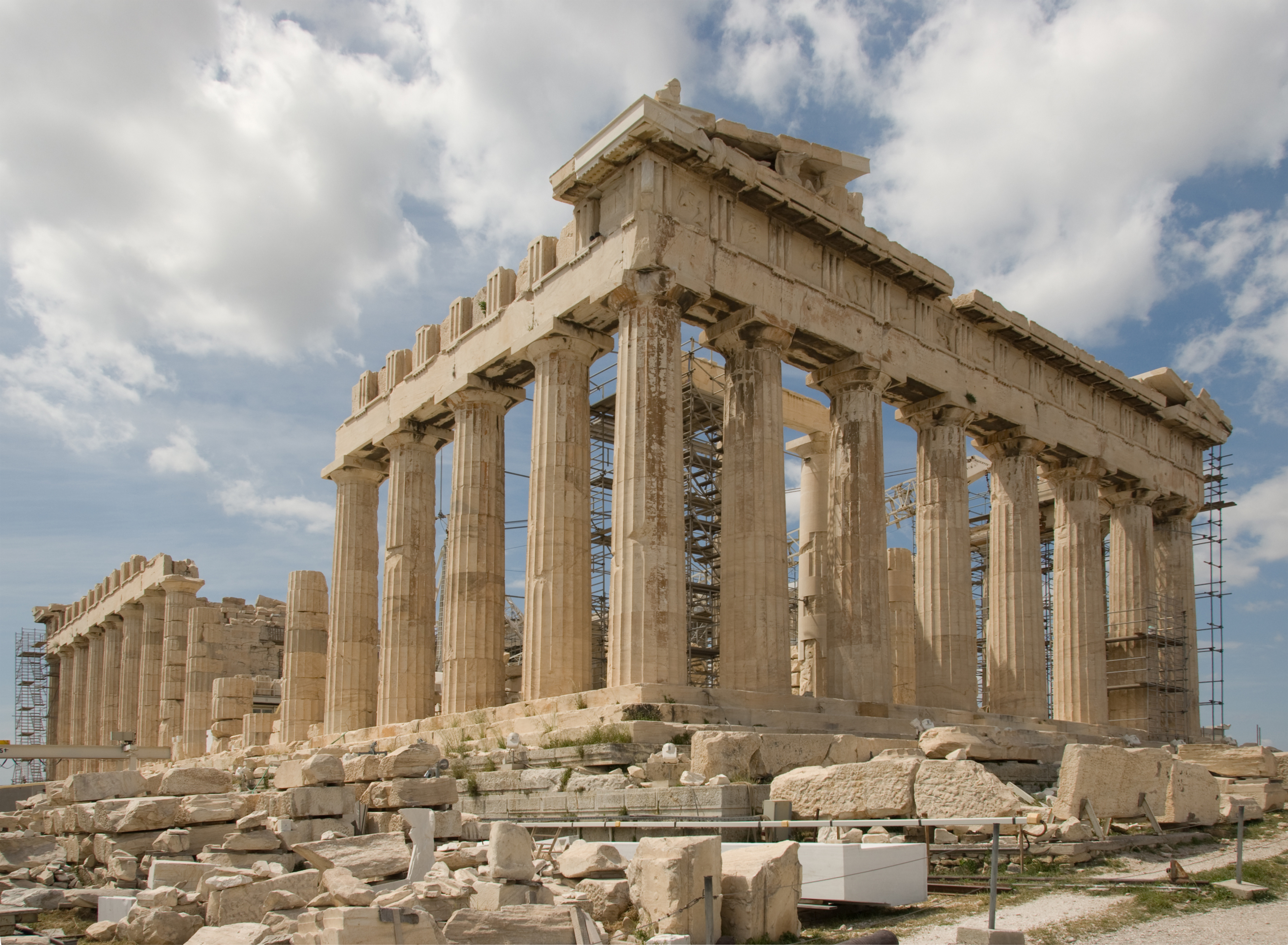
The Parthenon under restoration in 2008, the most iconic Classical building, built from 447 BC to 432 BC, located in Athens, Greece.

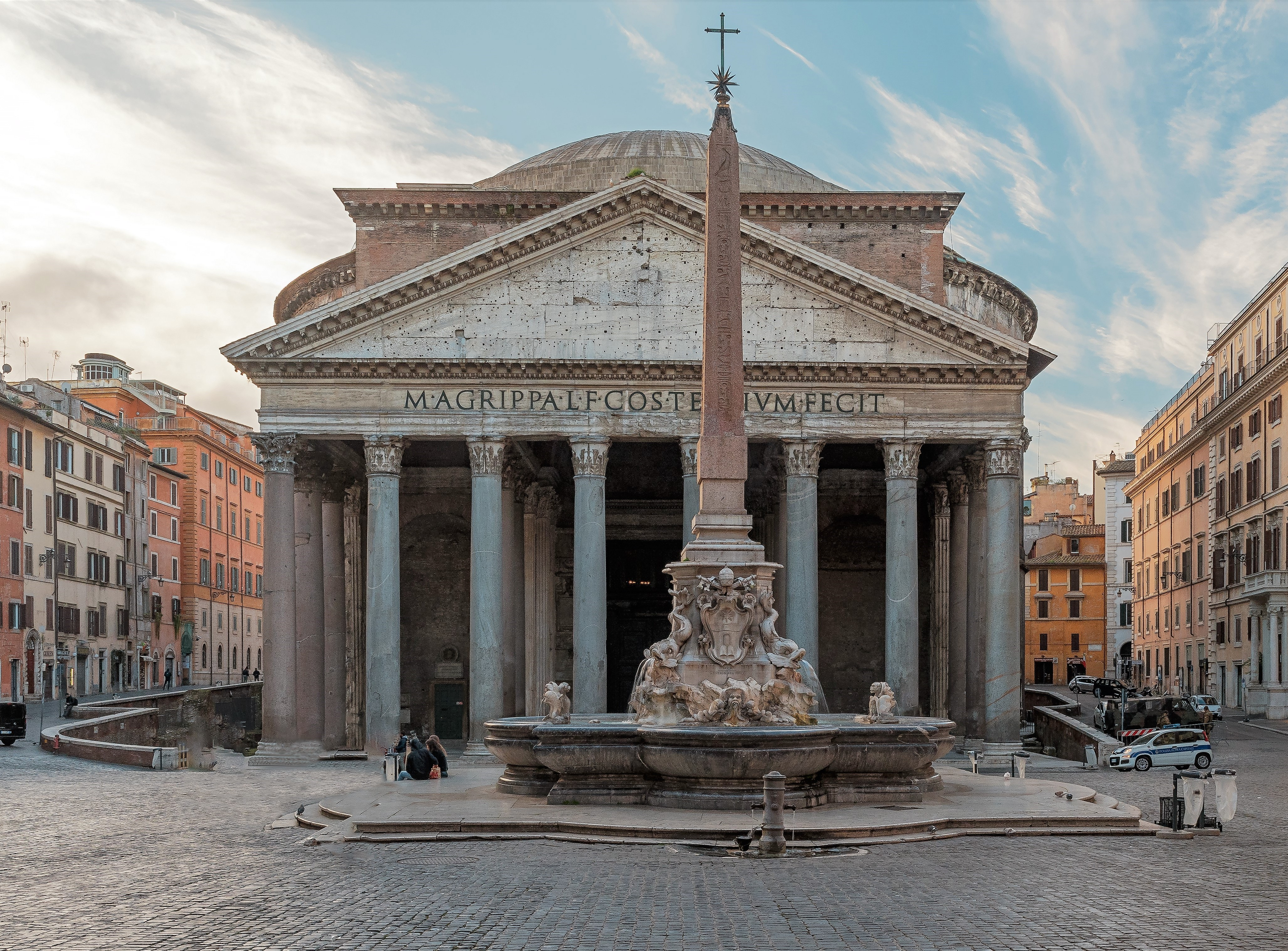
The Pantheon in Rome, inaugurated c. 126, is a major example of Roman Imperial Architecture. It was later converted into a Catholic church.

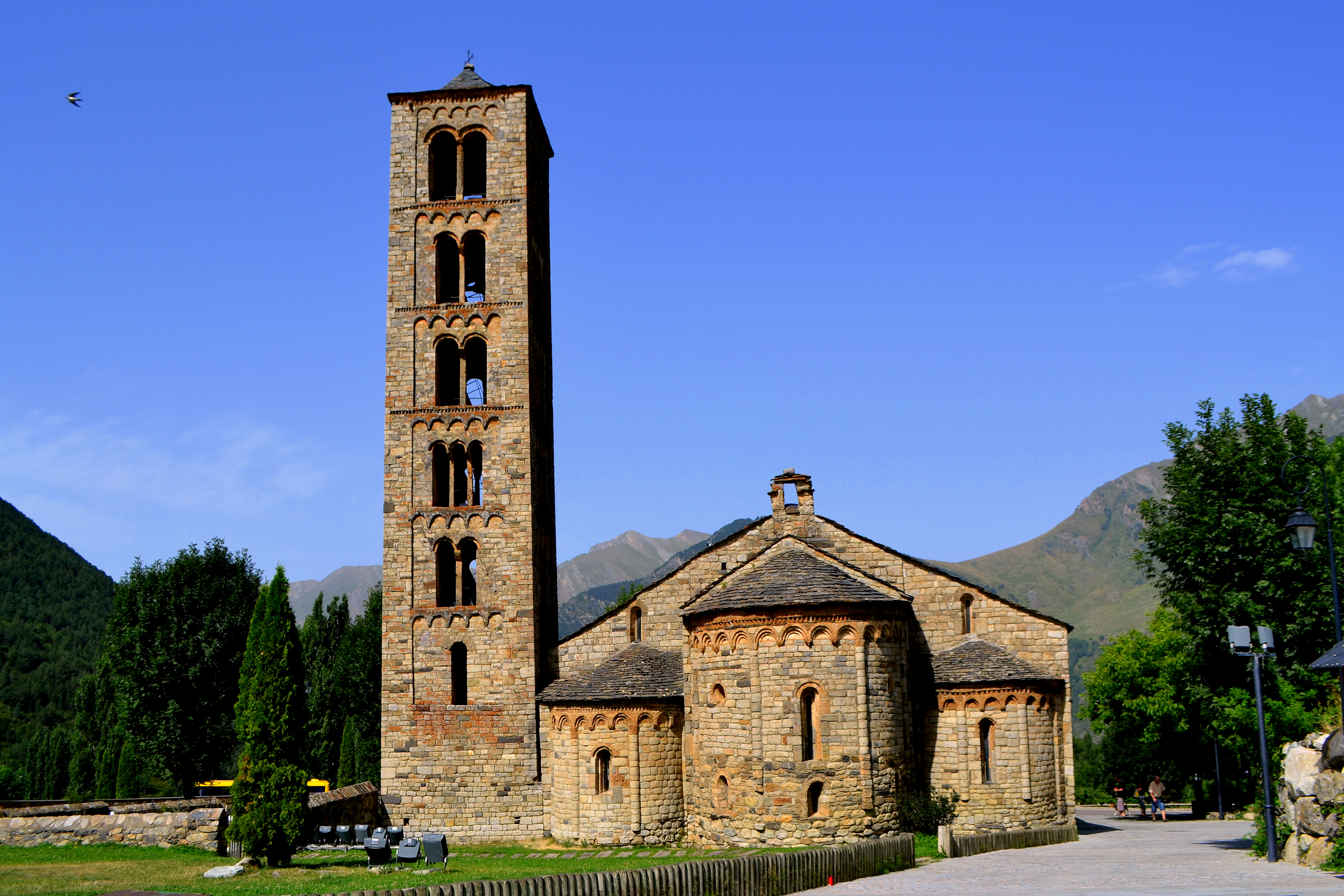
The Church of Sant Climent de Taüll, built around 1123, is an example of Romanesque architecture from the Iberian Peninsula.

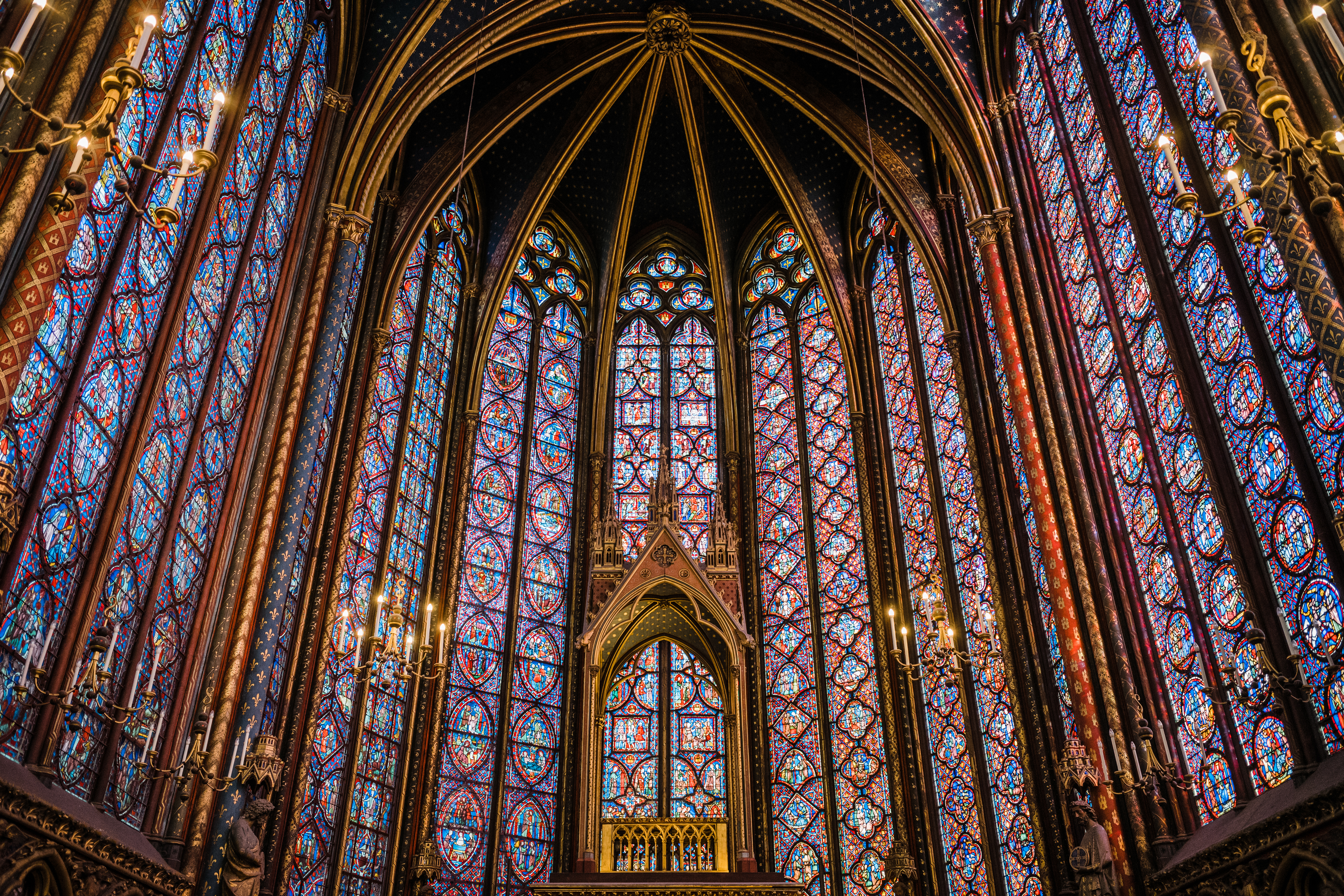
Stained glass windows of the Sainte-Chapelle in Paris, France, completed in 1248, mostly constructed between 1194 and 1220 in the Gothic style.

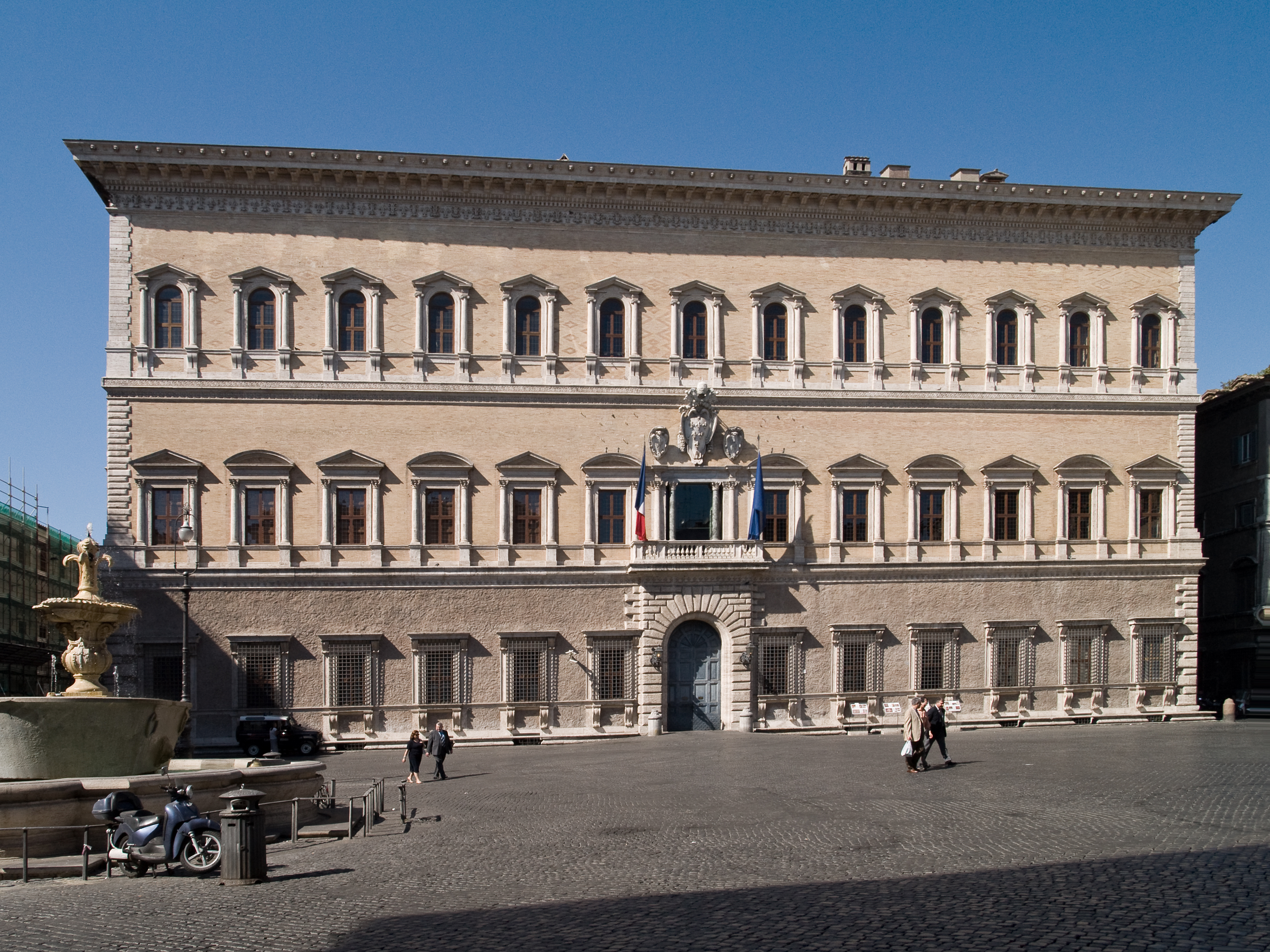
The Palazzo Farnese, in Rome, Italy, built from 1534 to 1545, was designed by Sangallo and Michelangelo and is an important example of Renaissance architecture.

Interior of the Church of La Candelaria, in Bogotá, Colombia, built between 1686 and 1703, an example of Spanish colonial Baroque architecture in the Americas.

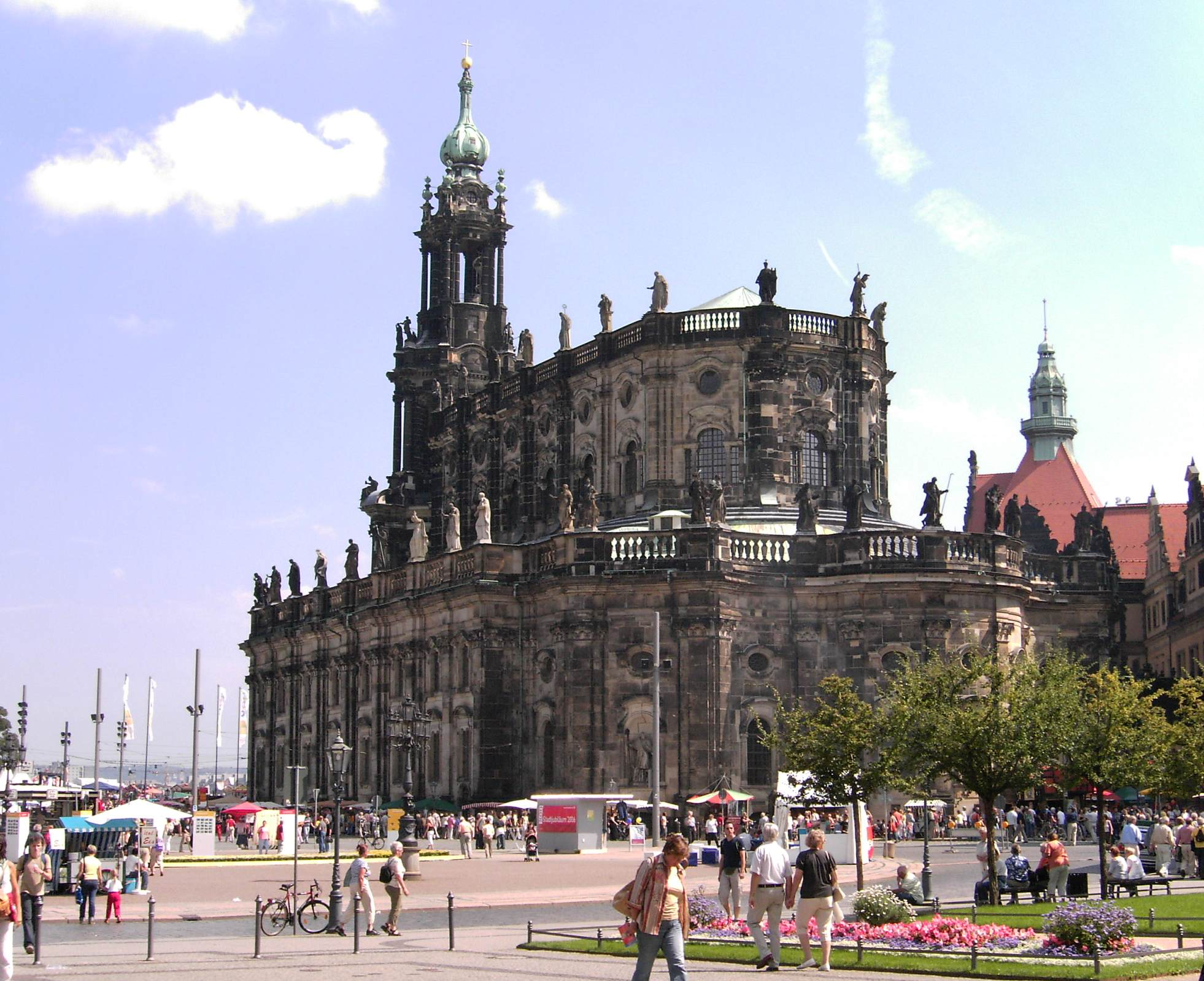
Dresden Cathedral in Dresden, Germany, a Baroque-style building constructed between 1739 and 1755.

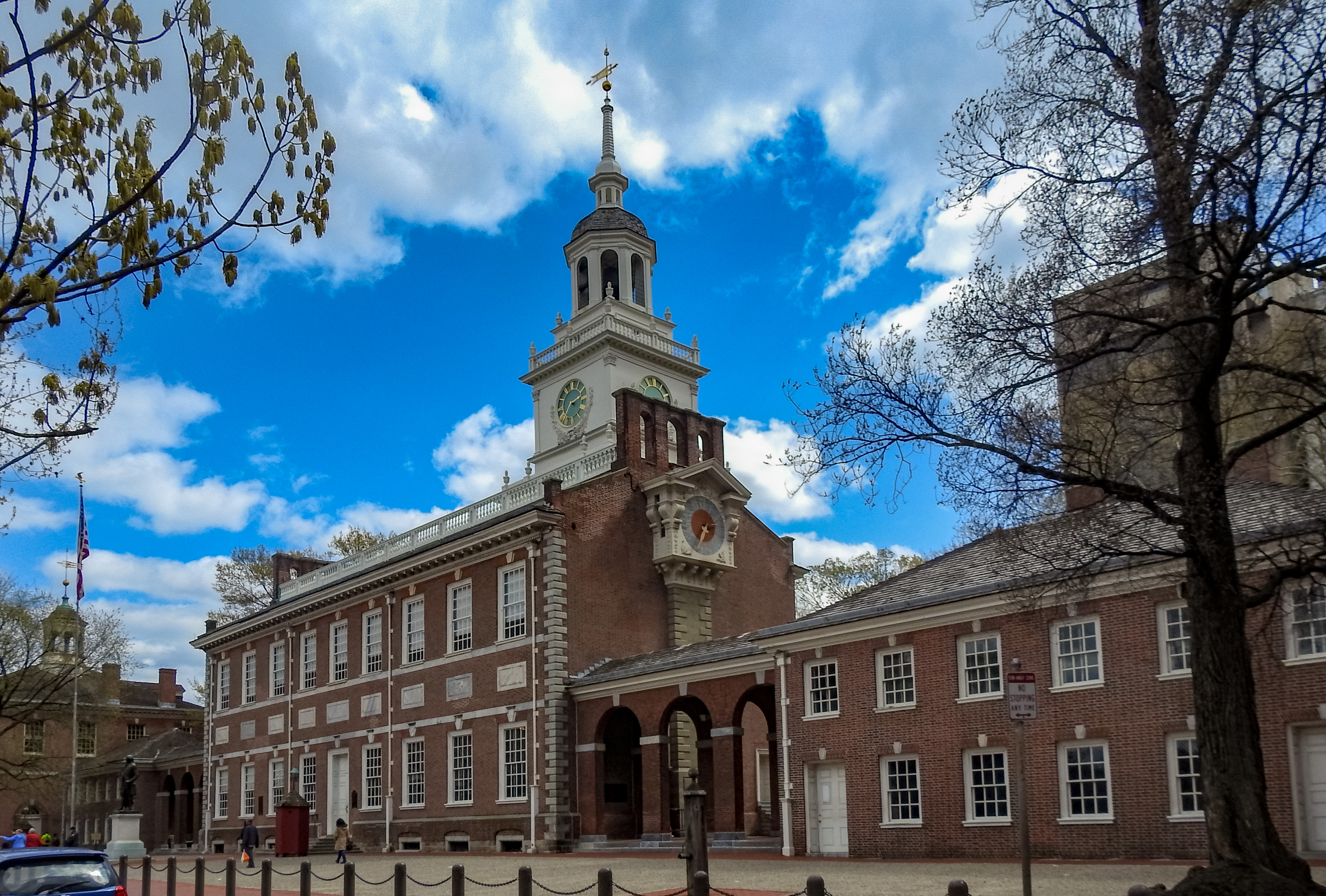
Independence Hall in Philadelphia, USA, completed in 1753, is an example of British colonial Georgian architecture in the Americas.

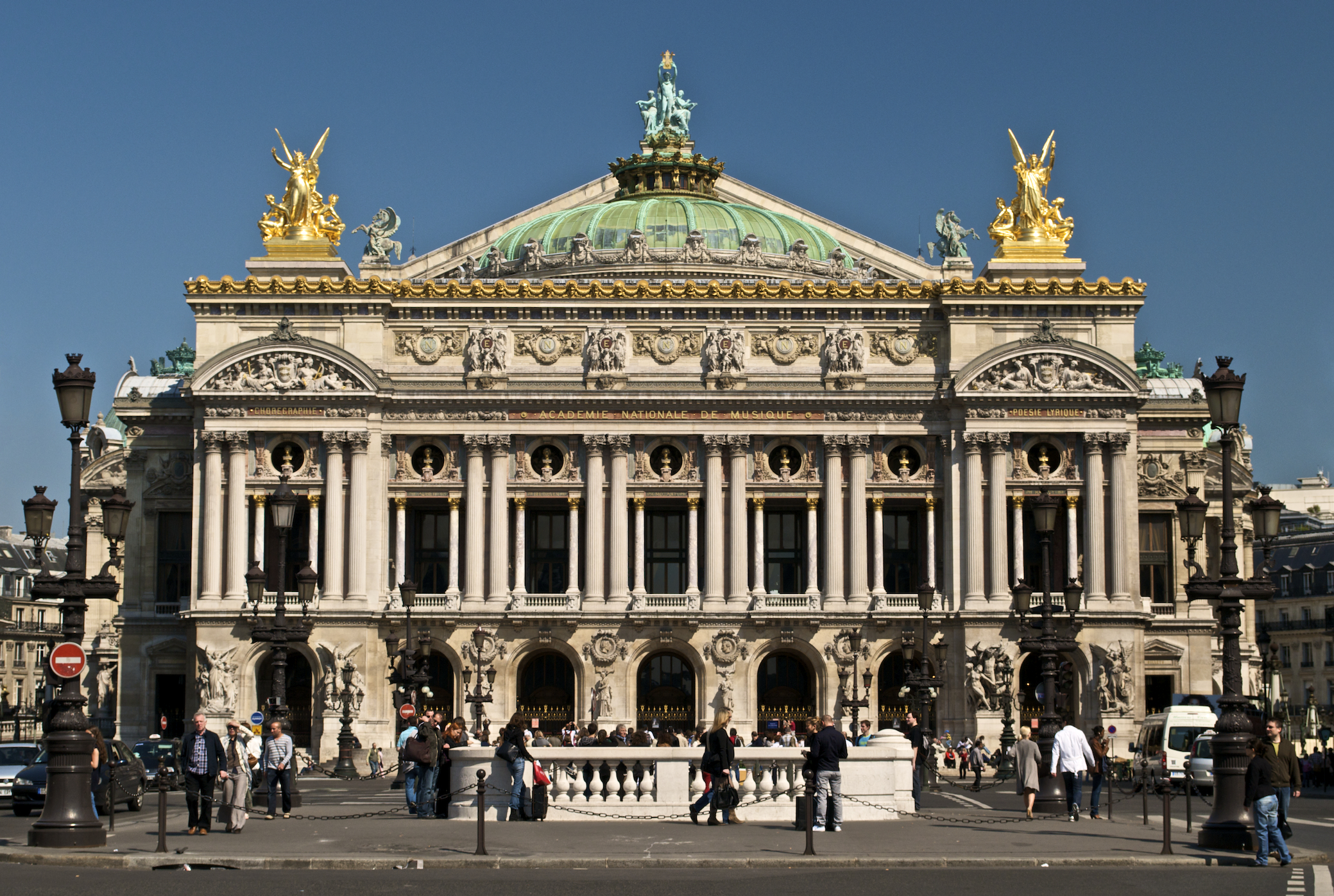
The Palais Garnier in Paris, France, built between 1861 and 1875, a Beaux-Arts masterpiece.

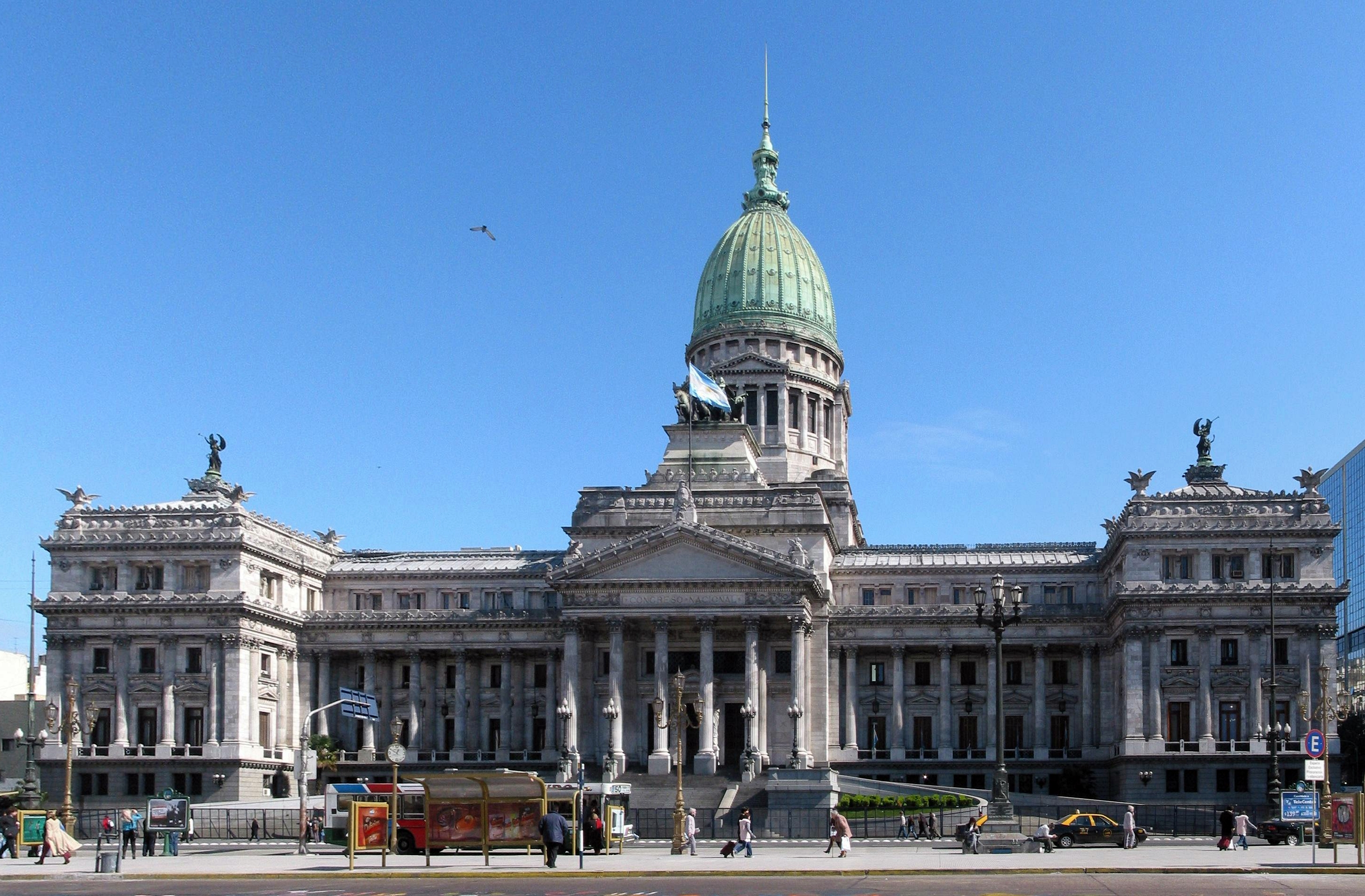
Palace of the Argentine National Congress in Buenos Aires, Argentina, built between 1897 and 1946 in a Neoclassical style.

Villa Savoye, built between 1928 and 1932, is a primary example of Modern architecture, which was developed by architects and thinkers from Europe and the Americas.

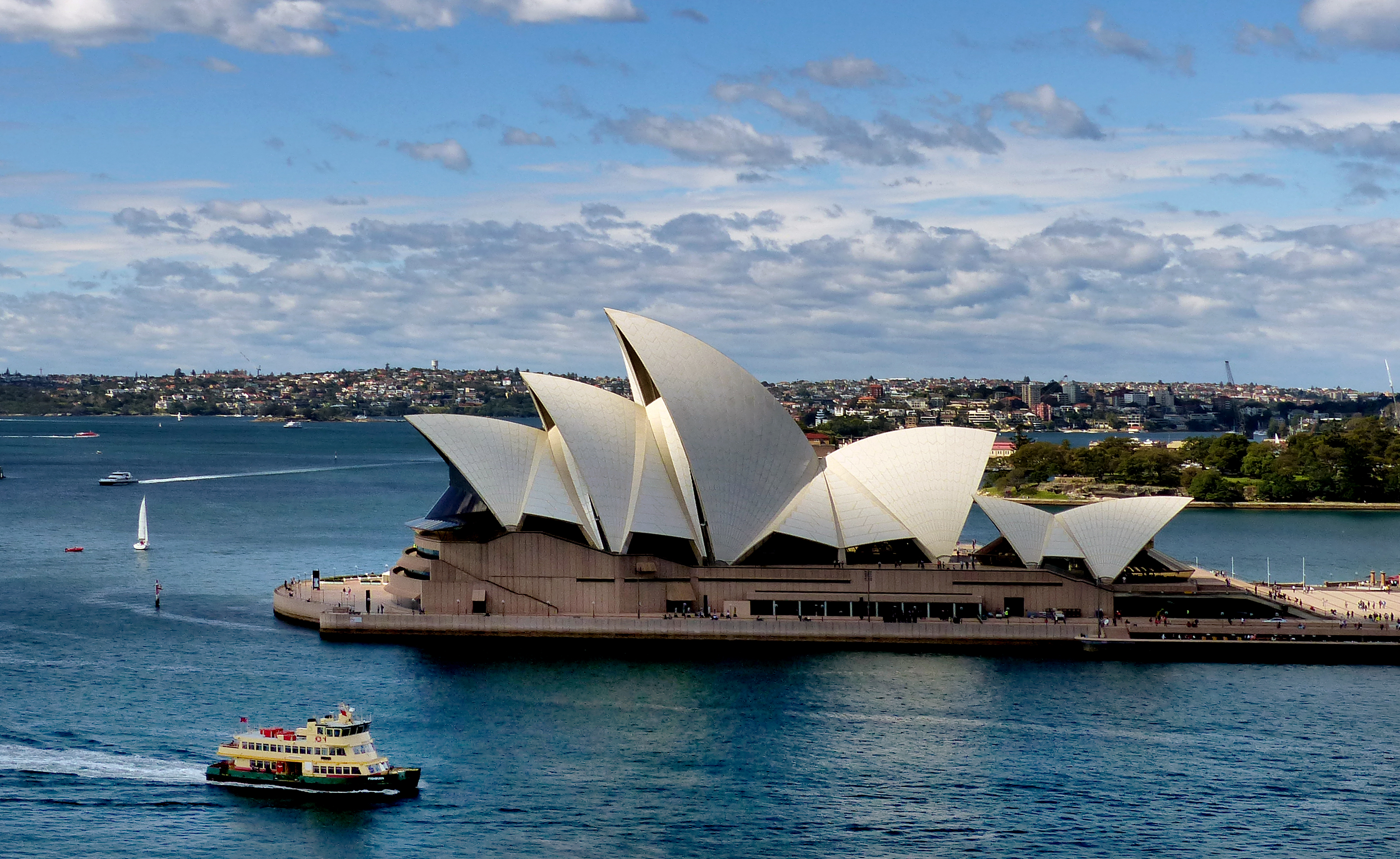
Sydney Opera House, built between 1959 and 1973, in Sydney, Australia and designed by Danish architect Jørn Utzon, an example of late 20th century Expressionist Modern architecture.

== Cuisine ==
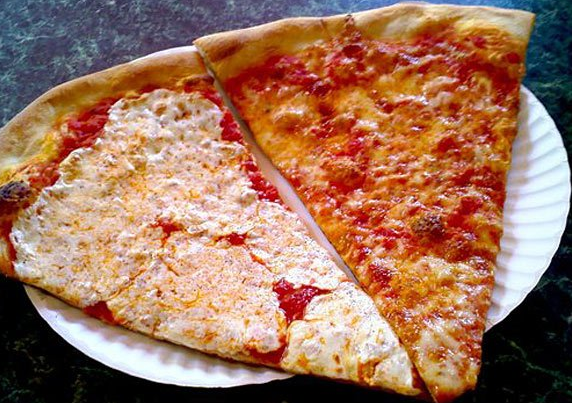
A slice of New York style pizza.

Western foodways were, until recently, considered to have their roots in the cuisines of Classical Rome and Greece, but the influence of Arab and Near Eastern cuisine on the West has become a topic of research in recent decades. The Crusaders, known mostly for fighting over holy land, settled in the Levant and acclimated to the local culture and cuisine. Fulcher of Chartres said "For we who were occidentals have now become orientals." These cultural experiences, carried back to France by notables like Eleanor of Aquitaine influenced Western European foodways. Many Oriental ingredients were relatively new to the Western lands. Sugar, almonds, pistachios, rosewater, and dried citrus fruits were all novelties to the Crusaders who encountered them in Saracen lands. Pepper, ginger and cinnamon were the most widely used spices of the European courts and noble households. By the end of the Middle Ages, cloves, nutmeg, mastic, galingale, and other imported spices had become part of the Western cuisine.

Saracen influence can be seen in medieval cookbooks. Some recipes retain their Arabic names in Italian translations of the Liber de Coquina. Known as bruet Sarassinois in the cuisine of North France, the concept of sweet and sour sauce is attested to in Greek tradition when Anthimus finishes his stew with vinegar and honey. Saracens combined sweet ingredients like date-juice and honey with pomegranate, lemons and citrus juices, or other sour ingredients. The technique of browning pieces of meat and simmering in liquid with vegetables is used in many recipes from the Baghdad cookery book. The same technique appears in the late-13th century Viandier. Fried pieces of beef simmered in wine with sugar and cloves was called bruet of Sarcynesse in English.

== Scientific and technological inventions and discoveries ==
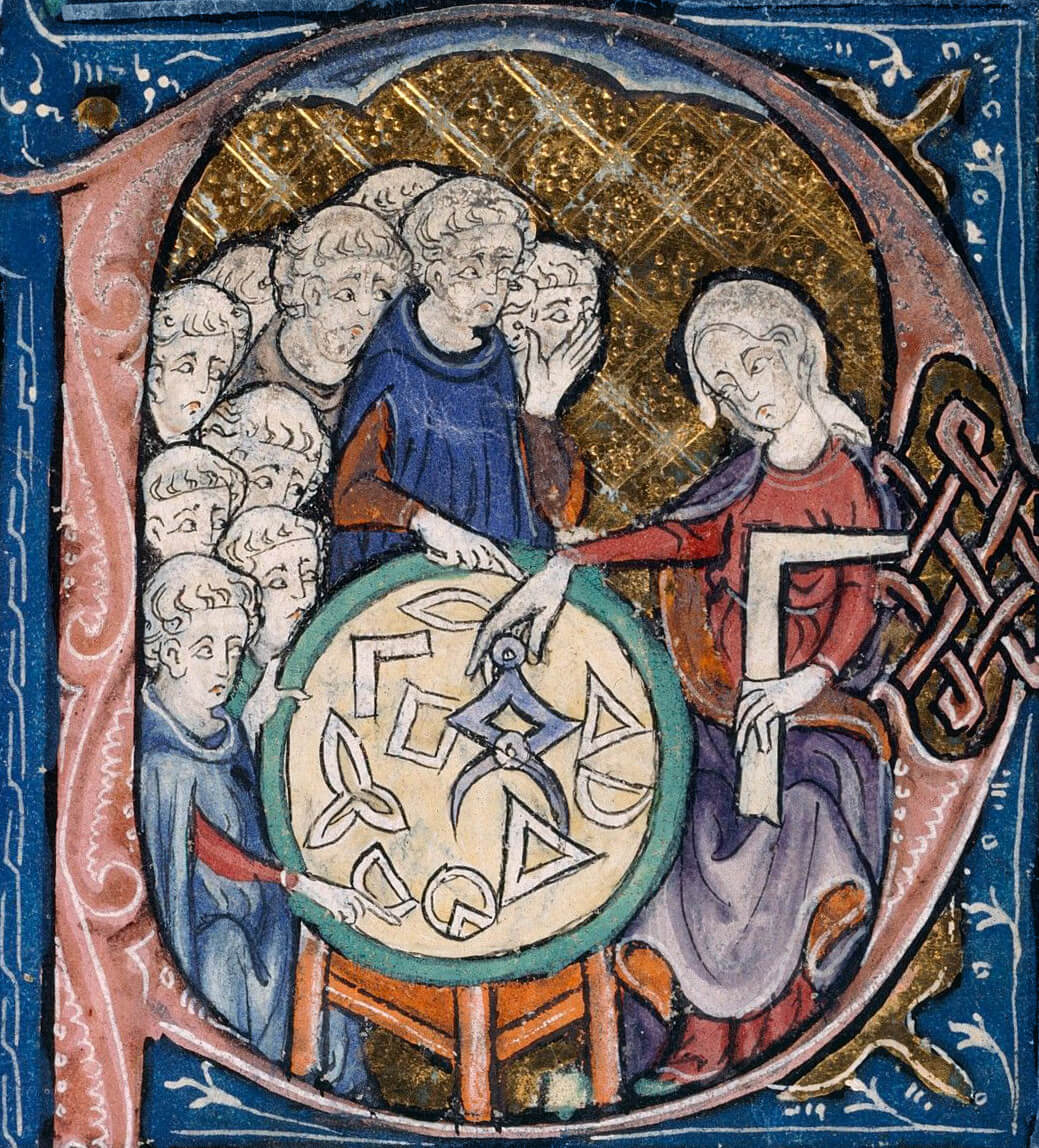
Medieval Christians believed that to seek the geometric, physical and mathematical principles that govern the world was to seek and worship God. Detail of a scene in the bowl of the letter 'P' with a woman with a set-square and dividers; using a compass to measure distances on a diagram. In her left hand she holds a square, an implement for testing or drawing right angles. She is watched by a group of students. In the Middle Ages, it is unusual to see women represented as teachers, in particular when the students appear to be monks. She is most likely the personification of Geometry, based on Martianus Capella's famous book De Nuptiis Philologiae et Mercurii [5th c.], a standard source for allegorical imagery of the seven liberal arts. Illustration at the beginning of Euclid's Elementa, in the translation attributed to Adelard of Bath.

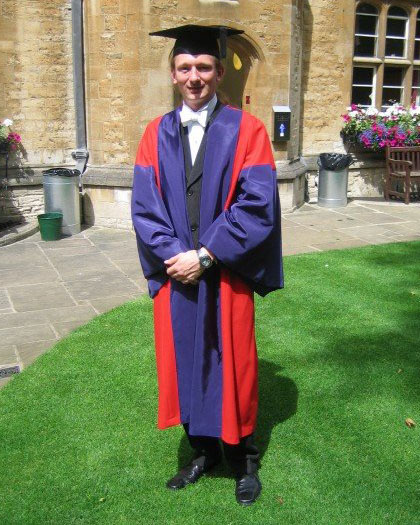
A doctor of philosophy of the University of Oxford, in full academic dress. The typical dress for graduation are gowns and hoods or hats adapted from the daily dress of university staff in the Middle Ages, which was in turn based on the attire worn by medieval clergy.

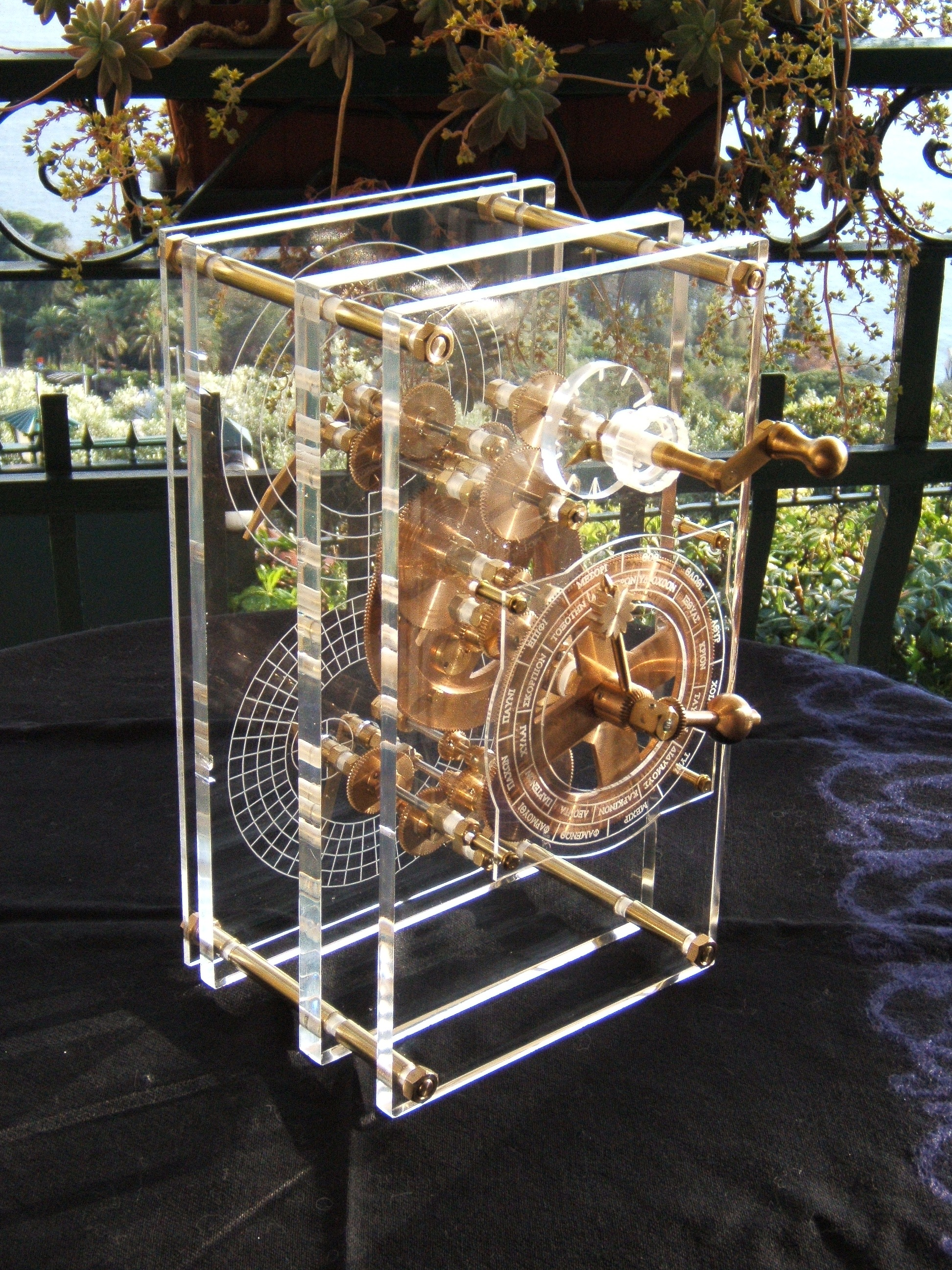
The Greek Antikythera mechanism is generally referred to as the first known analogue computer.

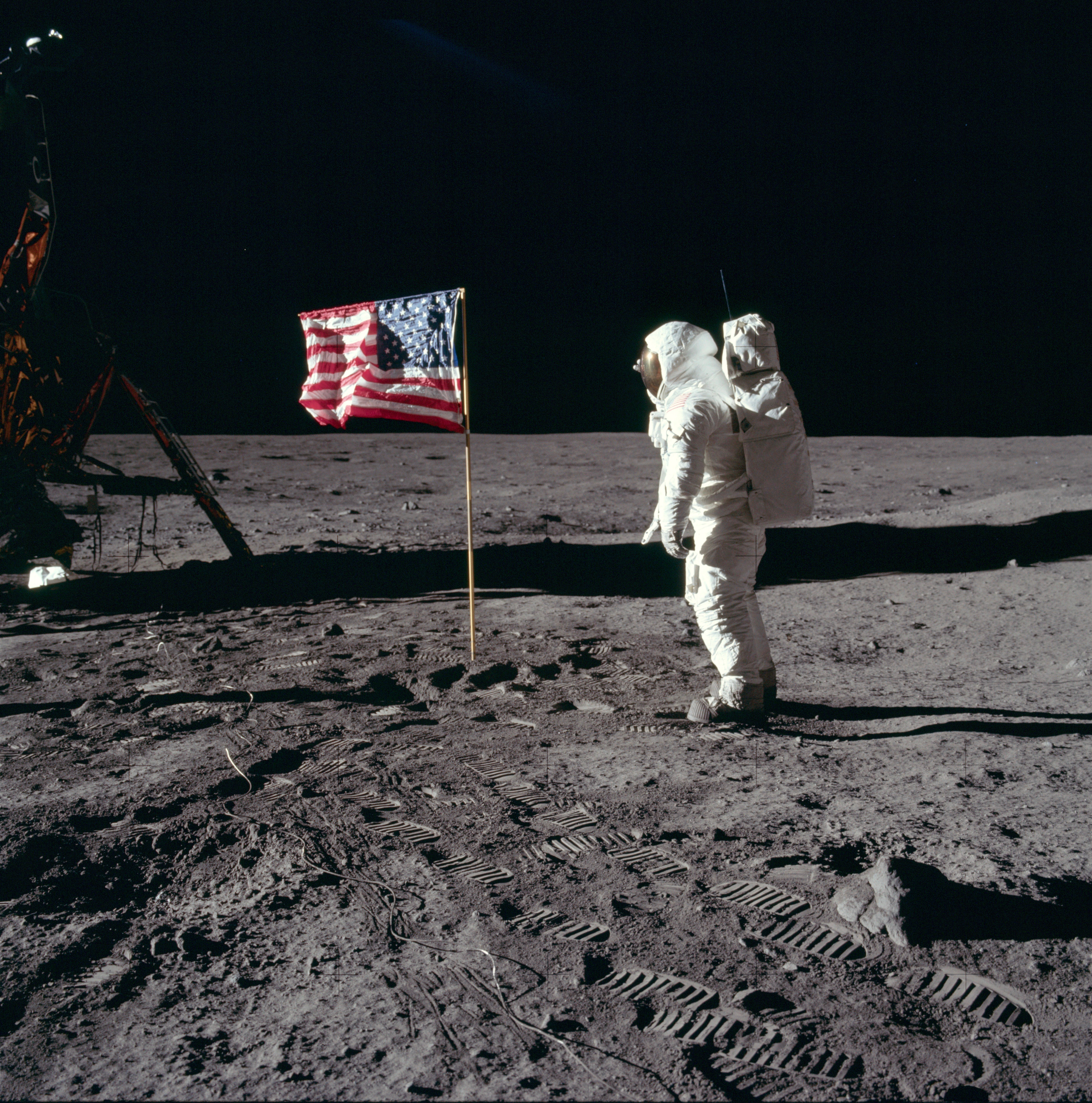
Apollo 11 astronaut Buzz Aldrin, Apollo Lunar Module pilot of the first crewed mission to land on the Moon, poses for a photograph beside the deployed United States flag during his Extravehicular Activity (EVA) on the lunar surface.

Historians of science generally note that from the early modern period onward, scientific research in Europe became increasingly institutionalized, contributing to the development of modern scientific methods and technologies. The scientific method as "a method or procedure that has characterized natural science since the 17th century, consisting in systematic observation, measurement, and experiment, and the formulation, testing, and modification of hypotheses" was significantly shaped by the work of the 17th-century Italian scientist Galileo Galilei, with roots in the work of medieval scholars such as the 11th-century Iraqi physicist Ibn al-Haytham and the 13th-century English friar Roger Bacon.

The United Kingdom is credited with the invention of the steam engine and adapting its use into factories, and for the generation of electric power. The electrical motor, dynamo, transformer, electric light, and most of the familiar electrical appliances, were developed primarily in the United States and United Kingdom. The Otto and the Diesel internal combustion engines are products whose genesis and early development were in Europe. Nuclear power stations are derived from the first atomic pile constructed in Chicago in 1942.

Several communication devices and systems such as the telegraph and telephone were developed or commercialized in Europe and North America during the nineteenth and twentieth centuries.

Ubiquitous materials were primarily discovered and developed in Europe and the United States. Iron and steel ships first appeared in the United Kingdom, and bridges and skyscrapers first appeared in the United States. Nitrogen fixation and petrochemicals were invented in Germany.

The transistor, integrated circuit, memory chip, first programming language, computer, and the first powered airplane was created in the United States.

In mathematics, many modern formal frameworks—such as calculus, statistics, logic, vectors, tensors, complex analysis, group theory, abstract algebra, and topology—were developed and systematized primarily in Europe during the early modern and modern periods, building on earlier contributions from ancient Greek, Indian, Islamic, and other mathematical traditions. In biology, several foundational theories of modern biology—including evolution, genetics, chromosomes, the structure of DNA, and the methods of molecular biology—were developed primarily in Europe and North America during the nineteenth and twentieth centuries, drawing on earlier global traditions in natural history and medicine. In physics, major modern theories such as mechanics, thermodynamics, statistical mechanics, relativity, and quantum mechanics were formulated chiefly within European scientific institutions, while incorporating insights from earlier scientific traditions worldwide. Key discoveries made by European scientists in electromagnetism include Coulomb's law (1785), the first battery (1800), the unity of electricity and magnetism (1820), Biot–Savart law (1820), Ohm's law (1827), and Maxwell's equations (1871).

The most widely adopted system of measurement, the International System of Units, derived from the metric system, was first developed in France and evolved through contributions from various Western countries.

In business, economics, and finance, double-entry bookkeeping was first used in Italy. Credit cards and the charge card were first used in the United States.

Western countries played a major role in explorations of the globe and outer space. The first expedition to circumnavigate the Earth (1522) was led by Ferdinand Magellan, as well as the first journey to the South Pole (1911) by Roald Amundsen, and the first Moon landing (1969) by NASA. The landing of robots on Mars (2004 and 2012) and on an asteroid (2001), the Voyager 2 explorations of the outer planets (Uranus in 1986 and Neptune in 1989), Voyager 1's passage into interstellar space (2013), and New Horizons' flyby of Pluto (2015) were significant recent achievements of the United States.

== Media ==
The roots of modern-day Western mass media can be traced back to the late 15th century, when printing presses began to operate throughout wealthy European cities. The emergence of news media in the 17th century has to be seen in close connection with the spread of the printing press, from which the publishing press derives its name.

In the 16th century, a decrease in the preeminence of Latin in its literary use, along with the impact of economic change, the discoveries arising from trade and travel, navigation to the New World, science and arts and the development of increasingly rapid communications through print led to a rising corpus of vernacular media content in European society.

After the launch of the satellite Sputnik 1 by the Soviet Union in 1957, satellite transmission technology was dramatically realized, with the United States launching Telstar in 1962 linking live media broadcasts from the UK to the US. The first digital broadcast satellite (DBS) system began transmitting in US in 1975.

Beginning in the 1990s, the Internet has contributed to a tremendous increase in the accessibility of Western media content. Departing from media offered in bundled content packages (magazines, CDs, television and radio slots), the Internet has primarily offered unbundled content items (articles, audio and video files).

== Religion ==
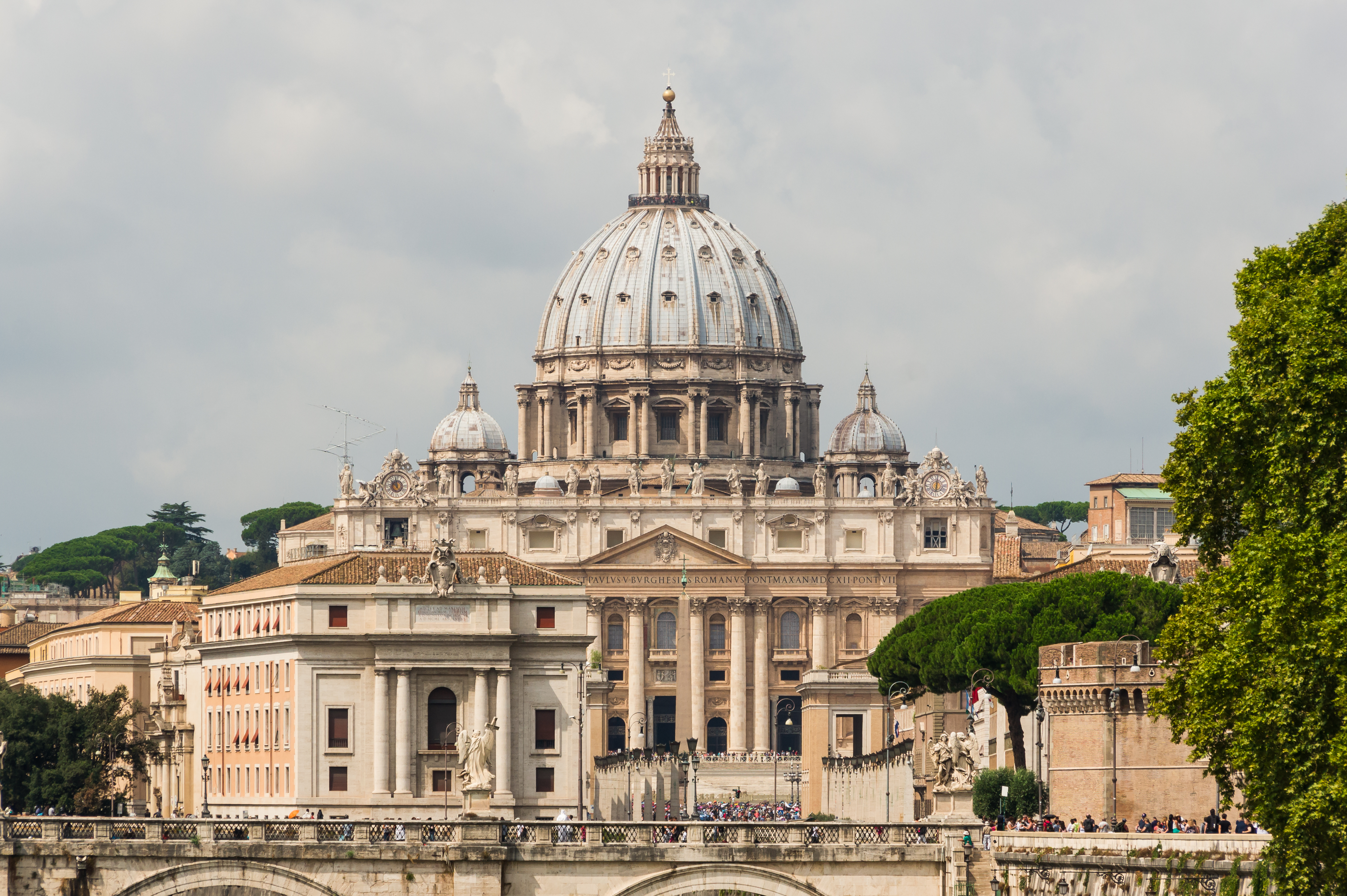
St. Peter's Basilica in the Vatican, the epicenter of the Catholic Church

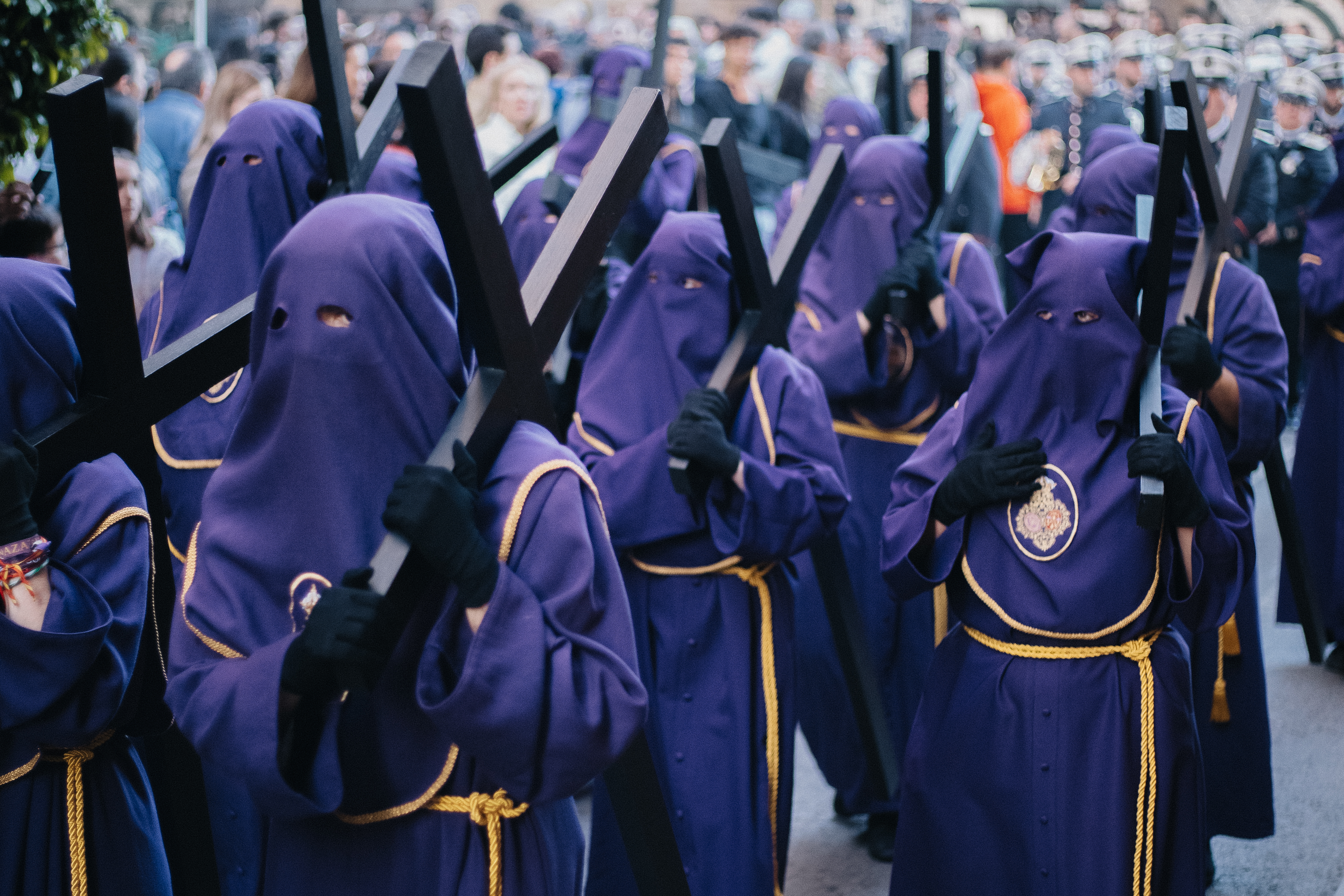
Holy Week in Almería, Spain

The native religions of Europe were polytheistic but not homogeneous—however, they were similar insofar as they were predominantly Indo-European in origin. Roman religion was similar to but not the same as Hellenic religion—likewise for indigenous Germanic polytheism, Celtic polytheism and Slavic polytheism. Before this time many Europeans from the north, especially Scandinavians, remained polytheistic, though southern Europe was predominantly Christian from the 5th century onwards.

Western culture at a fundamental level is influenced by the Judeo-Christian and Greco-Roman traditions. These cultures had a number of similarities, such as a common emphasis on the individual, but they also embody fundamentally conflicting worldviews. For example, in Judaism and Christianity, God is the ultimate authority, while Greco-Roman tradition considers the ultimate authority to be reason. Christian attempts to reconcile these frameworks were responsible for the preservation of Greek philosophy. Historically, Europe has been the center and cradle of Christian civilization.

Western Christianity by country in 2010

According to a survey by Pew Research Center from 2011, Christianity remains the dominant religion in the Western world where 70–84% are Christians, According to this survey, 76% of Europeans described themselves as Christians, and about 86% of the Americas' population identified themselves as Christians, (90% in Latin America and 77% in North America). 73% in Oceania self-identify as Christian, and 76% in South Africa are Christian.

Eurobarometer polls about religiosity in the European Union in 2012 found that Christianity was the largest religion in the European Union, accounting for 72% of the population. Catholics are the largest Christian group, accounting for 48%, while Protestants make up 12%, Eastern Orthodox make up 8% and other Christians make up 4% of the population respectively. In addition, non-believers/agnostics account for 16%, atheists account for 7%, and Muslims account for 2% of the population respectively. According to Scholars, in 2017, Europe's population was 77.8% Christian (up from 74.9% 1970), these changes were largely ascribed to the collapse of Communism and switching to Christianity in the former Soviet Union and Eastern Bloc countries.

At the same time, there has been an increase in the share of agnostic or atheist residents in Europe that accounted for 18% of the European population in 2012. In particular, over half of the population of the Czech Republic (79%) was agnostic, atheist or irreligious, compared to the United Kingdom (52%), Germany (25–33%), France (30–35%) and the Netherlands (39–44%).

As in other areas, the Jewish diaspora and Judaism exist in the Western world.

There are also small but increasing numbers of people across the Western world who seek to revive the indigenous religions of their European ancestors; such groups include Germanic, Roman, Hellenic, Celtic, Slavic, and polytheistic reconstructionist movements. Likewise, Wicca, New Age spirituality and other neo-pagan belief systems enjoy notable minority support in Western states.

== Sport ==
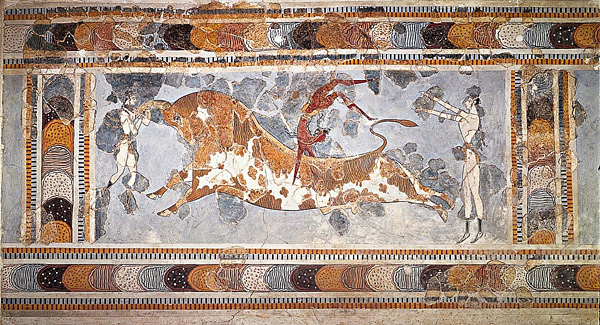
The Bull-Leaping Fresco from the Great Palace at Knossos, Crete. Sport has been an important part of Western culture since Classical Antiquity.

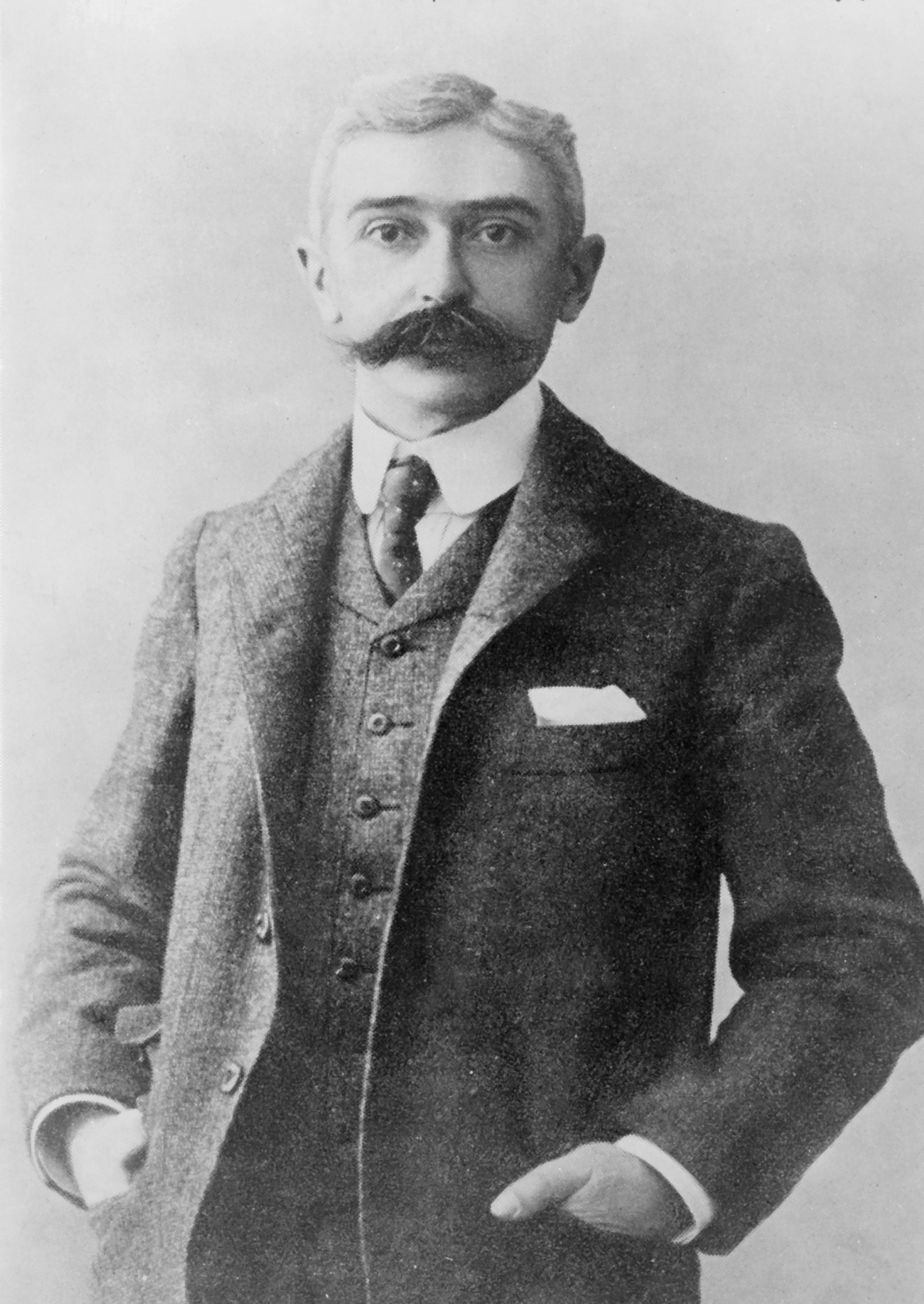
Baron Pierre de Coubertin, founder of the International Olympic Committee, and considered father of the modern Olympic Games

Since classical antiquity, sport has been an important facet of Western cultural expression.

A wide range of sports was already established by the time of Ancient Greece and the military culture and the development of sports in Greece influenced one another considerably. Sports became such a prominent part of their culture that the Greeks created the Olympic Games, which in ancient times were held every four years in a small village in the Peloponnesus called Olympia. Baron Pierre de Coubertin, a Frenchman, instigated the modern revival of the Olympic movement. The first modern Olympic games were held at Athens in 1896.

The Romans built immense structures such as the amphitheatres to house their festivals of sport. The Romans exhibited a passion for blood sports, such as the infamous Gladiatorial battles that pitted contestants against one another in a fight to the death. The Olympic Games revived many of the sports of classical antiquity—such as Greco-Roman wrestling, discus and javelin. The sport of bullfighting is a traditional spectacle of Spain, Portugal, southern France, and some Latin American countries. It traces its roots to prehistoric bull worship and sacrifice and is often linked to Rome, where many human-versus-animal events were held. Bullfighting spread from Spain to its American colonies, and in the 19th century to France, where it developed into a distinctive form in its own right.

Jousting and hunting were popular sports in the European Middle Ages, and the aristocratic classes developed passions for leisure activities. A great number of popular global sports were first developed or codified in Europe. The modern game of golf originated in Scotland, where the first written record of golf is James II's banning of the game in 1457, as an unwelcome distraction to learning archery.

The Industrial Revolution that began in Great Britain in the 18th century brought increased leisure time, leading to more opportunities for citizens to participate in athletic activities and also follow spectator sports. These trends continued with the advent of mass media and global communication. The bat and ball sport of cricket was first played in England during the 16th century and was exported around the globe via the British Empire. A number of popular modern sports were devised or codified in the United Kingdom during the 19th century and obtained global prominence; these include ping pong, modern tennis, association football, netball and rugby.

Football (or soccer) remains hugely popular in Europe, but has grown from its origins to be known as the world game. Similarly, sports such as cricket, rugby, and netball were exported around the world, particularly among countries in the Commonwealth of Nations, thus India and Australia are among the strongest cricketing states, while victory in the Rugby World Cup has been shared among New Zealand, Australia, England, and South Africa.

Australian Rules Football, an Australian variation of football with similarities to Gaelic football and rugby, evolved in the British colony of Victoria in the mid-19th century. The United States also developed unique variations of English sports. English migrants took antecedents of baseball to America during the colonial period. The history of American football can be traced to early versions of rugby football and association football. Many games are known as "football" were being played at colleges and universities in the United States in the first half of the 19th century. American football resulted from several major divergences from rugby, most notably the rule changes instituted by Walter Camp, the "Father of American football". Basketball was invented in 1891 by James Naismith, a Canadian physical education instructor working in Springfield, Massachusetts, in the United States. Volleyball was created in Holyoke, Massachusetts, a city directly north of Springfield, in 1895.

== Themes and traditions ==
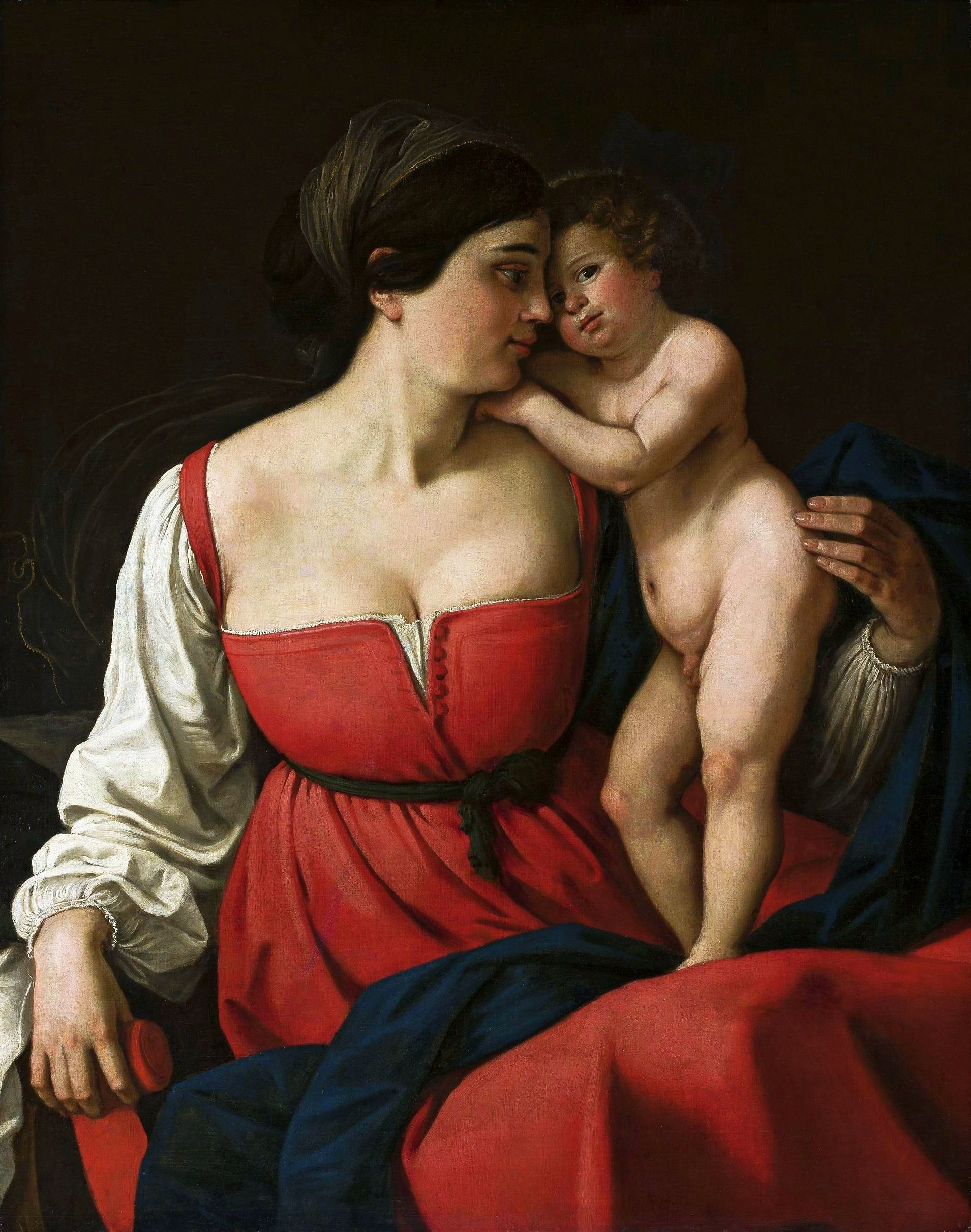
A Madonna and Child painting by an anonymous Italian from the first half of the 19th century, oil on canvas

Western culture has developed many themes and traditions, the most significant of which are:

- Greco-Roman classic letters, arts, architecture, philosophical and cultural tradition, which include the influence of preeminent authors and philosophers such as Socrates, Plato, Aristotle, Homer, Virgil, and Cicero, as well as a long mythologic tradition.
- Christian ethical, philosophical, and mythological tradition, stemming largely from the Christian Bible, particularly the New Testament Gospels.
- Monasteries, schools, libraries, books, book making, universities, teaching, education, and lecture halls.
- A tradition of the importance of the rule of law.
- Secular humanism, rationalism and Enlightenment thought. This set the basis for a new critical attitude and open questioning of religion, favouring freethinking and questioning of the church as an authority, which resulted in open-minded and reformist ideals inside, such as liberation theology, which partly adopted these currents, and secular and political tendencies such as separation of church and state (sometimes termed laicism), agnosticism and atheism.
- Generalized usage of some form of the Latin alphabet, used by the majority of Europe, Greek alphabet, used in Greece. Other variants of the Latin or Greek alphabets are found in the Gothic and Coptic alphabets, which historically superseded older scripts, such as runes, and the Egyptian Demotic and Hieroglyphic systems.
- Natural law, human rights, constitutionalism, parliamentarism (or presidentialism) and formal liberal democracy in recent times—prior to the 19th century, most Western governments were still monarchies.
- A large influence, in modern times, of many of the ideals and values developed and inherited from Romanticism.
- An emphasis on, and use of, science as a means of understanding the natural world and humanity's place in it.
- More pronounced use and application of innovation and scientific developments, as well as a more rational approach to scientific progress (what has been known as the scientific method).

== See also ==
- Atlanticism
- Christendom
- Classical tradition
- Culture during the Cold War
- Eastern world
- Eastern culture
- European diaspora
- Greco-Roman world
- Western education
- Western religion
- Westernization
- Western values
