= Franciscus Patricius =

Catholic priest, philosopher and scientist (1529–1597)

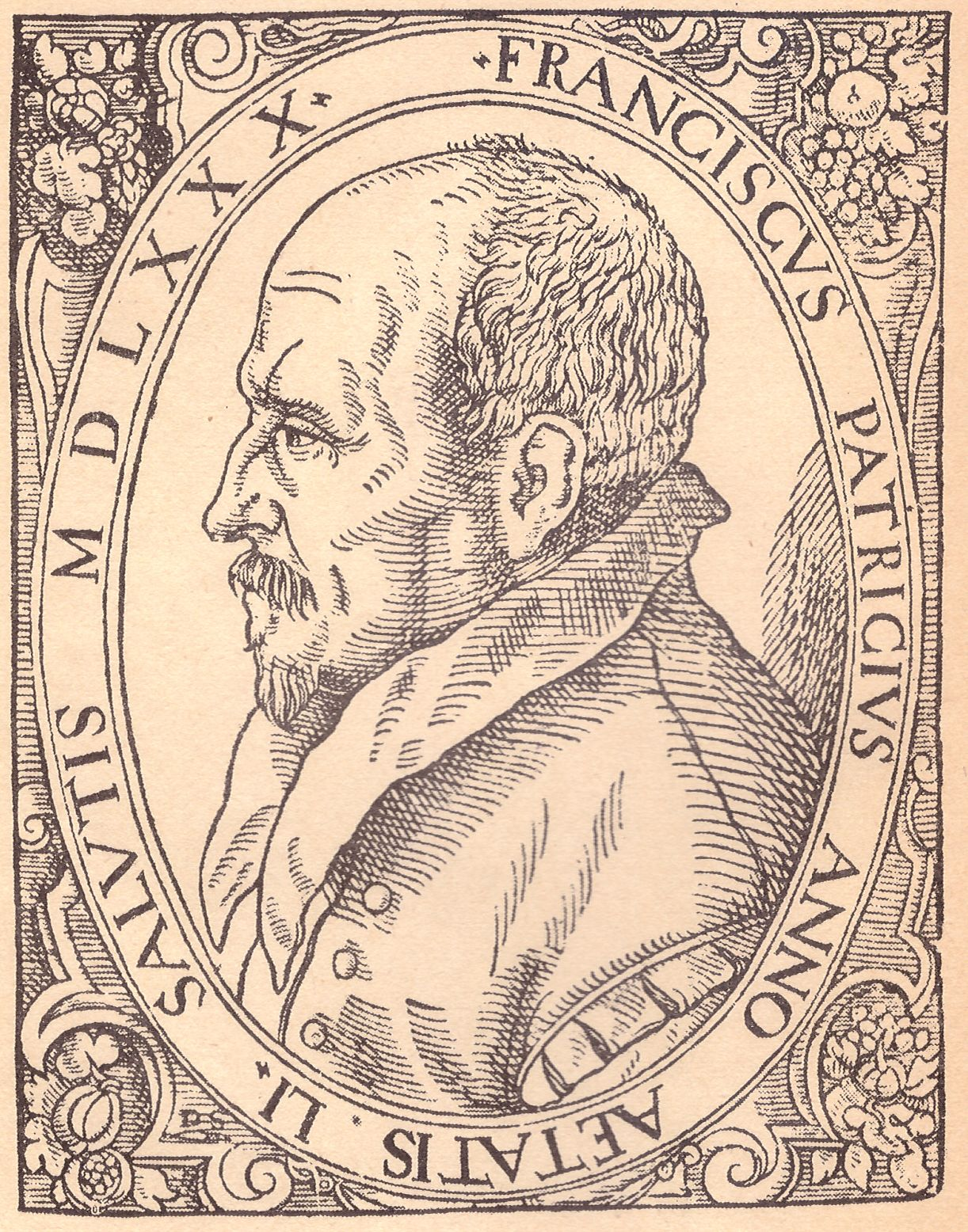
- Portrait of Franciscus Patricius from his book Philosophiae de rerum natura, vol. II, published in Ferrara in 1587
- Born: 25 April 1529; Cres, Republic of Venice (now Croatia)
- Died: 6 February 1597 (aged 67); Rome, Papal States

Education
- Education: Ingolstadt University; University of Padua

Philosophical work
- Era: Renaissance philosophy
- Region: Western philosophy
- School: Neoplatonism; Renaissance humanism
- Institutions: University of Ferrara; Sapienza University of Rome
- Main interests: Mathematics; poetry; astronomy; music; rhetorics; history
- Notable ideas: Infinite spatial expansion of the universe

Franciscus Patricius (Croatian: Franjo Petriš or Frane Petrić; Italian: Francesco Patrizi; 25 April 1529 – 6 February 1597) was a philosopher and scientist from the Republic of Venice. A native of Cres, he was a defender of Platonism and an opponent of Aristotelianism.

His national origin differs in sources, and he is described both as Croatian and as Italian. In Croatia he is mostly referred to as Franjo Petriš or Frane Petrić (sometimes Petris, Petrišević and Petričević). His family name in Cres was known as Petris.

Patricius initially dedicated his studies to Aristotelian Philosophy at the University of Padua, but turned to Platonism while still a student. He became a sharp, high-profile opponent of Aristotelianism, with whom he grappled extensively in several writings. After many years of unsuccessful efforts to secure material livelihood, he finally received an invitation in 1577 to the Ducal Court of House of Este in the Duchy of Ferrara. At the University of Ferrara, a chair for Platonic philosophy was set up especially for him. In the years that followed, he gained a reputation as a professor, but was also involved in scientific and literary controversy; he tended to polemic and was in turn violently attacked by opponents. In 1592, he accepted an invitation to Rome, where thanks to papal favor a new chair was created for him. The last years of his life were embroiled in a serious conflict with the Roman Inquisition, which banned his main work, the Nova de universis philosophia.

As one of the last Renaissance humanists, Patricius was characterized by extensive education, varied scientific activity, a strong will to innovate, and exceptional literary fertility. He critically examined established, universally recognized teachings and suggested alternatives. In particular, he wanted to replace the prevailing Aristotelian natural philosophy with his own model. He opposed the traditional view of the meaning of historical studies, which was usually restricted to moral instruction, with his concept of broad, neutral, scientific historical research. In poetry he emphasized the importance of inspiration and fought against conventional rules, which he considered to be arbitrary, unrealistic restrictions on creative freedom.

In the early modern period, Patricius's controversial philosophy of nature found sympathetic readers despite the church's condemnation, but remained an outsider position. Modern research recognizes his contributions to the constitution of modern concept of space and to historical theory.

== Origin and name ==
Francesco Patricius came from the town Cres on the homonymous island in front of Istria (Italian Cherso). At that time the island belonged to Republic of Venice. Francesco was an illegitimate son of the priest Stefano di Niccolò di Antonio Patricius (Stjepan Nikola Antun Petriš or Petrić), who belonged to the lower nobility. His mother was Maria Radocca (also "Borofcich"), a local woman who later married another man, and possibly "shared the bed with two priests of the same [Patrizi] family." In older literature, Francesco's father was mistakenly identified with the judge of the same name, Stefano di Niccolò di Matteo Patricius, and his mother Maria was identified with Maria Lupetino, the judge's alleged wife. Another incorrect claim connects Patricius to the famous theologian Matthias Flacius.

According to Francesco, his family was originally based in Bosnia and, according to their coat of arms, was of royal descent. Allegedly, in the fifteenth century, an ancestor of Patricius named Stefanello came to Cres as a result of the Turkish conquest of her homeland. In his book, Paralleli militari, he said he descended from the Patrizi family from Siena.

Following a humanistic custom, the philosopher Latinized his name and called himself Patricius or Patritius. Since he lived in Italy and published his works there, Francesco Patricius has become the international standard, although variants of the Croatian form are preferred in Croatia. The addition "da Cherso" (from Cres) serves to distinguish it from the Siena humanist Francesco Patricius (Franciscus Patricius Senensis), who lived in the 15th century.

== Life ==
=== Youth and education ===
Francesco Patricius was born on 25 April 1529 in Cres. He initially spent his childhood in his hometown. His uncle Giovanni Giorgio Patricius (Ivan Juraj Petriš), who commanded a Venetian warship, took the only nine-year-old boy on a war campaign against the Turks in February 1538. Francesco participated in the Battle of Preveza, in which the Christian fleet was struck and Patricius almost fell into Turkish captivity. He spent several years at sea. In September 1543, he went to Venice to acquire a professional qualification. Initially he went to a commercial school according to Giovanni Giorgio's will, but his inclination was for humanism. His father encouraged Patricius's wish and had his son receive Latin lessons. His father later sent him to study in Ingolstadt, where there was the seat of the Bavarian University. There he acquired knowledge of Greek. In 1546, however, he had to leave Bavaria because of the turmoil of the Schmalkaldic War.

In May 1547 Patricius went to Padua, whose university was one of the most respected universities in Europe. His father initially intended Patricius to study medicine with Giambattista Montano, Bassiano Lando and Alberto Gabriele. When Stefano died in 1551, Patricius was able to drop out of medical training, sell his medical books, and resume his interests in humanistic education. During his studies, he attended philosophical lectures by professors Bernardino Tomitano, Marcantonio de 'Passeri (Marcantonio Genova), Lazzaro Buonamici and Francesco Robortello. Among his friends and fellow students was Niccolò Sfondrati, who later became pope as Gregory XIV. Philosophy classes were a disappointment for Patricius, because Padua was a stronghold of Aristotelian, whose representatives continued the tradition of medieval Scholastic. This was a direction that Patricius firmly rejected and later wrote against. Under the influence of a Franciscan scholar, he turned to Platonism. The Franciscan recommended the Neoplatonic teaching of the humanist Marsilio Ficino (1433–1499). Ficino's writings, especially his major philosophical-theological work, the Theologia Platonica, greatly affected Patricius's philosophical thought. He later expressed his distance to Padua's scholastic-Aristotelian teaching practice by writing in an autobiographical letter in 1587, as self-taught represented. While still a student, Patricius began to write and publish philosophical and philological writings, printing a collection of his early works in Venice in 1533.

=== First attempts to secure livelihood (1554–1560) ===
In 1554, Patricius had to return to Cres because of a lengthy dispute over the inheritance of his uncle Giovanni Giorgio. Patricius's time at Cres was characterized by illness, isolation, and family conflict. At that time he apparently belonged to the spiritual class - at least until 1560. He was unsuccessful in finding a living through an ecclesiastical position. After this failure, he went to Rome in 1556, but his efforts for a benefice also failed. After moving to Venice, the young scholar unsuccessfully sought employment at the courtyard of the house Este in Ferrara. At last Patricius was able to gain a foothold in the Venetian humanist circles by joining the scholarly community, Accademia della Fama.

=== Activities in Cyprus (1560–1568) ===
In 1560, Patricius entered the service of the Venetian patrician Giorgio Contarini. While initially tutoring his employer in Aristotelian ethics, Patricius soon won Contarini's trust and was sent to Cyprus to inspect and report on the family property, which was administered by Contarini's brother. When he described the situation on his return in the summer of 1562, Contarini sent him again to Cyprus and gave him authorization to carry out measures for improvement. As the new administrator, Patricius ensured by melioration, a significant increase in the value of the land, which could now be used for growing cotton. However, the measures required were costly and poor harvests also reduced income, so that the client could not be satisfied. Contarini's Cypriot relatives, who Patricius discredited with his report, took this opportunity to take revenge and to blame the administrator on the head of the family. When Patricius's justification was not accepted, he asked to be released in 1567.

Patricius initially stayed in Cyprus. He now entered the service of the Catholic Archbishop of Nicosia, the Venetian Filippo Mocenigo, who entrusted him with the administration of the villages belonging to the Archdiocese. But in 1568, with the island under Turkish threat, he left the island with the archbishop and went to Venice. In retrospect, he saw the years in Cyprus as lost time. After all, he used the stay in the Greek-speaking world for an important humanistic concern: he searched for Greek manuscripts with considerable success, which he then bought or had written down, or perhaps even copied himself.

=== Varying endeavors for a material livelihood (1568–1577) ===
Upon his return, Patricius returned to science. He now went to Padua again, where he apparently no longer worked at the university but only gave private lessons. Among his disciples was Zaccaria Mocenigo, a nephew of the archbishop. It was very important to him to exchange ideas with the well-known philosopher Bernardino Telesio, with whom he later remained in correspondence.

During this time, Patricius's relationship with the archbishop deteriorated. He made contact with Diego Hurtado de Mendoza y de la Cerda, the viceroy of Catalonia, who was an enthusiastic book collector. The beginning of this connection was promising: the viceroy invited him to Barcelona and offered him the prospect of employment as a court philosopher with an annual salary of five hundred ducat. As a result, Patricius made his first trip to Spain. In Barcelona, however, he was very disappointed because the financial promise was not kept. For these circumstances, the philosopher was forced to return in 1569.

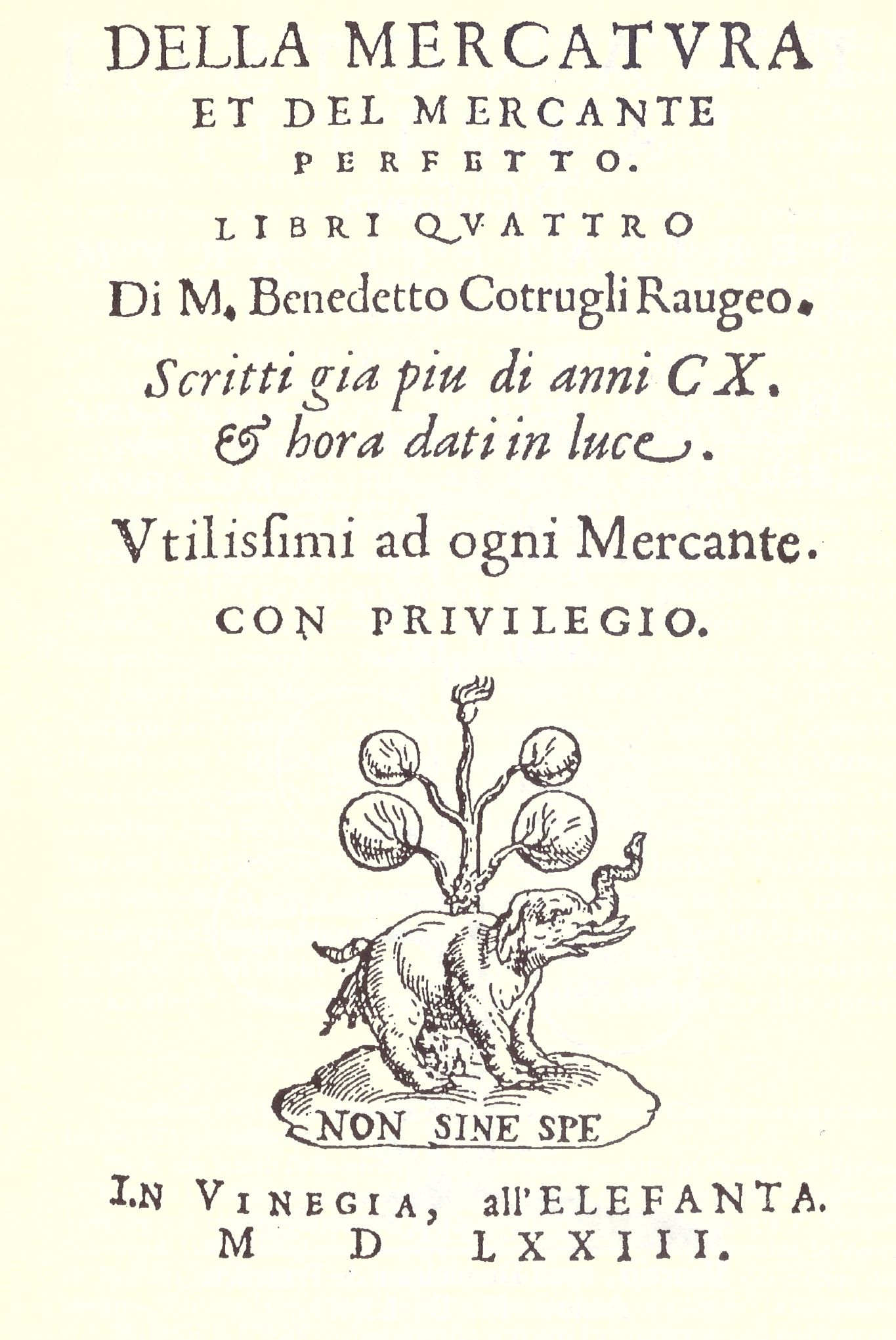
The title page of a work by Benedetto Cotrugli published in 1573 by Patriciuss Verlag with the publisher's emblem showing a nursing and parturient elephant.

One of the benefits of the trip, however, was the prospect of making a living in the long-distance book trade. The export of books from Italy to Barcelona seemed lucrative; Patricius had been able to reach an agreement with business partners there before he left. Shipping started and actually proved worthwhile at first, but the company eventually failed because of the philosopher's inexperience and lack of business talent. A serious blow hit Patricius in 1570 when the Turks in Cyprus captured a shipment of goods belonging to him and intended for export to Venice, for which he had spent 3,500 ducats. As a result, he got into such trouble that he turned to his former employer, Contarini, who he still owed him 200 ducats. When the latter refused to pay, a lengthy process appeared which Patricius apparently lost.

In order to restructure his financial situation, Patricius turned to book production. In August 1571 he entered into a contract with the heir to the manuscript of a script by the late scholar Girolamo Ruscelli about Emblems, Le imprese illustri. He took over the editing, and the work was published the following year by a Venetian printer. However, Patricius was unable to meet his contractual obligations due to his precarious financial situation. This resulted in a conflict, which was difficult to resolve. After this unpleasant experience, Patricius founded his own publishing house, all'Elefanta. There he published three books in 1573, but then the publisher went in. The philosopher then went on a new trip to Spain in 1574 to sue his former business partners and sell Greek manuscripts. In February 1575 he was received by Antonio Gracián, the secretary king Philip II, Who gave him for the royal library in the El Escorial 75 Codices. From a humanistic point of view, however, this commercial success was questionable, because the Escorial was considered a "book grave" by the scholars. When the legal proceedings for the failed book trade dragged on without any foreseeable result, Patricius returned home after thirteen months.

Upon his return, Patricius settled in Modena in 1577, where he entered the service of the respected musician and poet Tarquinia Molza, to whom he gave Greek lessons.

=== Professorship in Ferrara (1578–1592) ===
In Modena, Patricius received the invitation to the ducal court of Ferrara that had been sought two decades ago. At the turn of the year 1577/1578 he arrived in Ferrara. He was warmly received by the Duke, Alfonso II, D'Este, an important cultural patron. His advocate there was the Ducal Council - from 1579 secretary - Antonio Montecatini, who valued him very much, although he was a representative of the Aristotelianism that Patricius had fought against from a Platonic perspective. At Montecatini's suggestion, a chair for Platonic philosophy was set up for Patricius at the University of Ferrara. The starting salary of 390 lire was later increased to 500. The time of material worries was over.

With the move to Ferrara, the new professor began an enjoyable and profitable phase of life. He was highly regarded both at the glamorous court of Alfonso and in the academic environment. He was friends with the Duke. Patricius also had a good personal relationship with the famous poet Torquato Tasso, who lived in Ferrara, even though he had a controversy with him in a controversial event. In the fourteen years of his work in Ferrara, he published numerous writings.

However, Patricius's dedicated opinions on philosophical and literary issues also caused controversy and led to disputes. Because of Aristotle's criticism, a written polemic with the Aristotelian Teodoro Angelucci ensued. In the literary field, Patricius was involved in a dispute over the criteria of poetic quality, in which Camillo Pellegrino and Torquato Tasso took the opposite view.

=== Professorship in Rome, conflict with censorship and death (1592–1597) ===
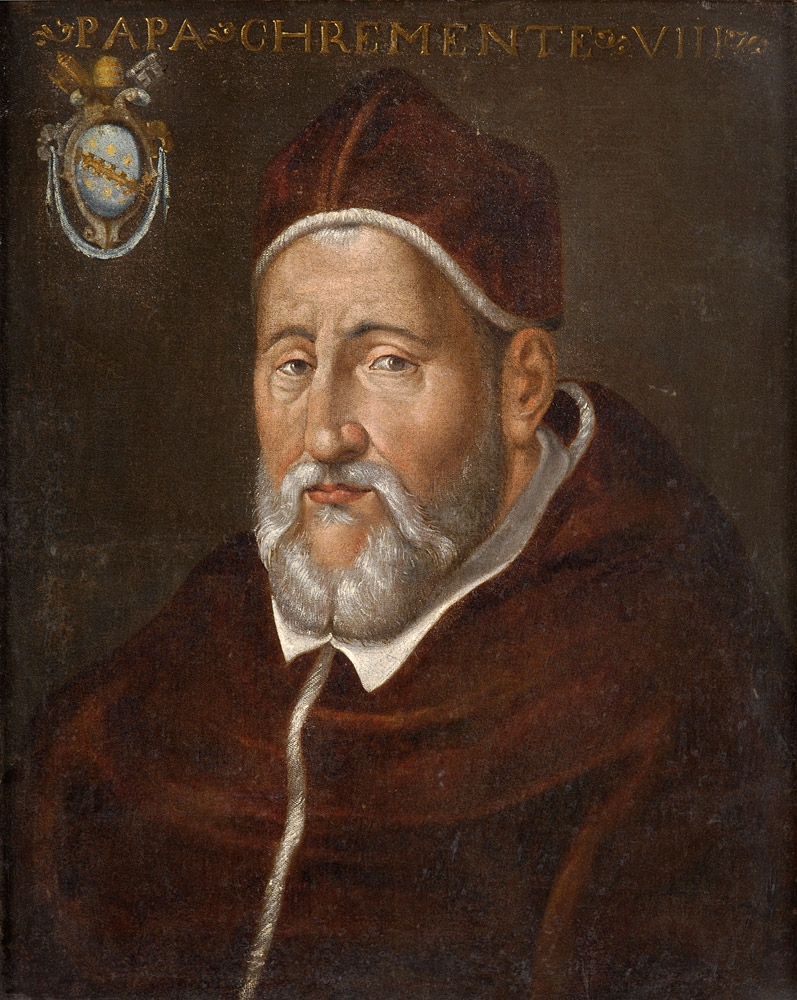
Portrait of Pope Clement VIII, Patricius' patron.

Patricius's academic career finally peaked thanks to the benevolence of Cardinal Ippolito Aldobrandini, who invited him to Rome in October 1591. In January 1592 Aldobrandini was elected Pope and took the name Clement VIII. He gave an enthusiastic welcome to the scholar who arrived in Rome on 18 April 1592. At the Sapienza University of Rome, a chair for Platonic philosophy was created for Patricius. The professor had his residence in the house of Cinzio Passeri Aldobrandini, who was a nephew of the Pope and a well-known patron and was raised to Cardinal in 1593. On 15 May, he gave his inaugural lecture on Plato's "Timaios" "to a large audience. The allowance granted to him - 500 ducats basic salary, with allowances a good 840 ducats" - was the highest on the Sapienza. It was a sign of the special papal favor that the Platonist received. Among his listeners and interlocutors was Torquato Tasso, now living in Rome, who did not regret the conflict in Ferrara.

Despite his excellent relationship with the Pope, Patricius soon became a target of church censorship. The occasion was his major philosophical work Nova de universis philosophia, which he published in Ferrara in 1591. There the censor Pedro Juan Saragoza discovered a number of statements which he considered heretical or at least suspicious and which he denounced in an expert report. Among other things, he declared the statement that the earth was rotating to be erroneous because this was incompatible with the Scriptures. According to the consensus of the theologians, it can be gathered from the Bible that the fixed star sky revolves around the immovable earth.

In October 1592 the index congregation, the authority responsible for the Index of Forbidden Books. In November 1592, she summoned the author of the suspect document and allowed him to read Saragoza's report, which was unusual for the accused at the time. Patricius responded to the censor's attack with a letter of defense, the Apologia ad censuram, in which he basically declared his submission, but defended his position aggressively and assumed Saragoza incompetence. He found no understanding. He later tried unsuccessfully to satisfy the panel with written explanations of his teaching and concessions. Even after the Congregation decided in December 1592 to list the Nova de universis philosophia in the new version of the index, the author continued his rescue efforts, while the publication of the new index of 1593 was delayed. The main disadvantage was that the censor responsible last, the Jesuit Francisco de Toledo, was a well-known representative of the patriotic scholastic Aristotelianism. In July 1594 the congregation banned the distribution and reading of the work and ordered the destruction of all traceable copies. Scripture was listed in the updated edition of the index, which appeared in 1596, and in subsequent editions. However, the author was expressly encouraged to submit an amended version for approval. The aged and conflict-ridden philosopher tackled the revision, but was unable to finish it because he died on 7 February 1597 with a fever. He was buried in the Roman church Sant'Onofrio al Gianicolo next to Torquato Tasso.

== Works ==
Most of Patricius's writings are in Italian, the rest in Latin. The Latin part of the oeuvre primarily includes two monumental works: the Discussiones peripateticae, an extensive pamphlet against Aristotelianism, and the Nova de universis philosophia, the unfinished overall presentation of his teaching.

=== Antiaristotelian writings ===
==== Discussiones peripateticae ====
The struggle against Aristotelianism was a central concern of Patricius, which is evident everywhere in his texts. He wanted not only to refute individual teachings of the ancient thinker, but to bring the entire system to collapse. For this purpose, he wrote a polemical script which he called Discussiones peripateticae (Peripatetic Examinations), referring to the Peripatos, Aristotle's School of Philosophy. The first impulse came from a request from his student Zaccaria Mocenigo, who asked him to write a story about Aristotle. Patricius fulfilled this request with the original version of the Discussiones, a critical examination of the life and works of the Greek philosopher, which he published in Venice in 1571. Later, after a long interruption, he took up the systematic analysis of Aristotelianism again and expanded his original text to a comprehensive criticism of the peripatetic interpretation of the world. In this expansion of the project, the Discussiones printed in 1571 were the first volume to be incorporated into a four-volume work, which Patricius had printed in folio in Basel in Pietro Perna in 1581. In doing so, he submitted a polemical script, which was also designed as a manual for Aristotelianism.

The first volume consists of thirteen books. The first book offers a detailed biography of Aristotle, the second a list of works. The following seven books contain philological studies. It is about clarifying the questions as to which of the traditionally attributed writings to Aristotle actually come from him, which work titles are authentic and how the writings are to be arranged systematically. Patricius defines a number of stylistic, substantive and historical criteria for the distinction between genuine and fake writings. Particular attention is paid to the fragments from lost works by the Greek thinker, which are preserved in later ancient literature. They are compiled in large numbers. The tenth book deals with the history of reception. The last three books are devoted to the various methods that can be used for interpreting teaching and for Aristotelian philosophizing.

In the second volume, Patricius compares peripatetic philosophy with older teachings, especially Platonism. His intention is to discredit Aristotle as plagiarism or and compiler. However, he expresses himself cautiously, because this volume is dedicated to his friend and colleague Antonio Montecatino, the holder of the chair for Aristotelian philosophy in Ferrara. A contrast to this is the open, violent polemic in the last two volumes, in which the author gives up his reluctance. The third volume presents the peripatetic teachings as incompatible with those of the pre-Socratics and Plato. Patricius discusses the disagreements between the authorities on the basis of a plethora of contradicting statements, always declaring Aristotle's view to be wrong . From his point of view, Aristotelianism is a decline in intellectual history, a falsification and destruction of the knowledge of earlier thinkers. The fourth book serves to prove errors in Aristotelian natural philosophy.

When dealing with peripatetic thinking, Patricius attaches great importance to taking Aristotle's doctrine directly from his own words and not - as has been customary since the Middle Ages - to be influenced by the interpretations of the numerous commentators. In addition, he demands that Aristotle's view not be backed up by a single statement, as was previously the case, but rather that all relevant statements by the philosopher be used. In the Discussiones peripateticae Patricius does not consistently go from a Platonic alternative system to Aristotelianism but also takes advantage of arguments based on nonplatonic, rather nominalistic and empirical ideas. He sees a fateful development in philosophy: the first pupils of Aristotle still thought independently and also contradicted their teacher; later, however, Alexander of Aphrodisias surrendered unconditionally to the school founder and, thus, renounced free thinking. The first medieval Arabic-language interpreters, Avicenna, Avempace and Alfarabi, were still relatively unbiased, but then Averroes had the absolute authority of Aristotle proclaimed and thus pointed the way to sterile, scholastic Aristotelism.

==== Controversy with Teodoro Angelucci ====
The devastating verdict on Aristotelian philosophy in the Discussiones peripateticae led to controversy with the Aristotelian Teodoro Angelucci. The latter responded to the Discussiones with a counter-writing in which he sharply criticized Patricius's statements on metaphysics and natural science. The attacked man replied to this with the Apologia contra calumnias Theodori Angelutii (Defense against Teodoro Angelucci's defamation), which he had printed in 1584. The following year, Angelucci continued the argument with another combat script, the Exercitationes (Exercises).

=== Metaphysics, natural philosophy, mathematics and number symbolism ===
==== Preparatory work on the system of the "new philosophy" ====
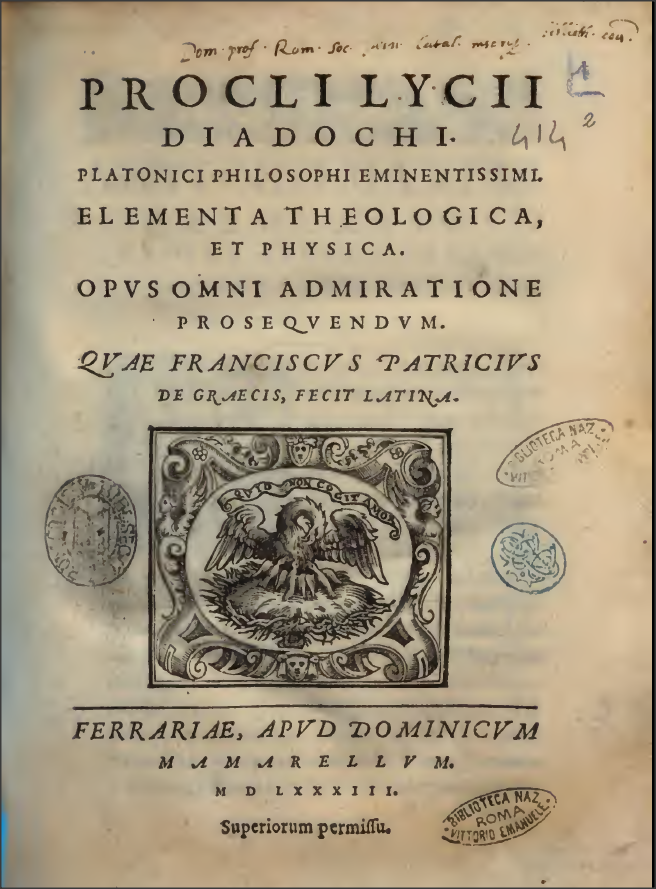
Patricius' 1583 Latin translation of Proclus's work Elements of Theology

In the 1580s, Patricius worked on preparatory work for an overall presentation of his philosophical system, which he conceived as an alternative to Aristotelianism. First, he provided relevant material. He translated the commentary of the pseudo - John Philoponus on the Metaphysics of Aristotle as well as the Elementatio physica and the Elementatio theologica of the late antique Neoplatonist Proclus (412–485) into Latin. Both translations were printed in 1583. Then Patricius worked out his theory of space. In the Treatise Della nuova geometria, which he dedicated to Charles Emmanuel I, Duke of Savoy, he laid a new foundation for the geometry that he preferred Euclidean definitions. In 1587 a Latin representation of his understanding of space appeared as the first part of a Philosophia de rerum natura (Philosophy on the nature of things). This publication consists of the two books De spacio physico (About the physical space) and De spacio mathematico (About the mathematical space). There he presented his alternative to Aristotelian cosmology and physics.

Patricius's work Zoroaster et eius CCCXX oracula Chaldaica (Zarathustra and its 320 Chaldean oracles), the first independent modern collection of fragments of the Chaldean Oracles, was also created as part of this preliminary work. He believed that it was authentic teachings Zarathustras and the oracles were the oldest evidence of the history of philosophical thought. It was therefore important to him to secure the text inventory. The positions were taken from works by the late antique authors Proklos, Damaskios, Simplicius of Cilicia, Olympiodorus and Synesius. His collection, which comprises 318 oracle verses, was a strong extension of the previously authoritative compilation of Georgios Gemistos Plethon, which contains only sixty Hexameter.

==== Nova de universis philosophia ====
According to his plan, Patricius's main work, the Nova de universis philosophia (New Philosophy of Things in its entirety) should consist of eight parts and explain its entire world interpretation. However, he was able to complete only the first four parts and publish them in Ferrara in 1591. He worked on another part, De humana philosophia, in 1591/1592, but the manuscript remained incomplete and the conflict with the censorship authority prevented its completion and publication. The author dedicated the first edition of 1591 to Pope Gregory XIV, With whom he had a friendship from his childhood in Padua.

In the preface recommended to the Pope that the Pope profoundly changed the Catholic school system: in the teaching of ecclesiastical educational institutions - religious schools and universities under papal control - he proposed to replace Aristotelianism, which had dominated the Middle Ages, with an alternative world view that was superior to the prevailing school philosophy . Five models would be considered. The first is his own system according to the Nova de universis philosophia, the second the Zoroastrianism, the third the Hermetics, the teaching of the Hermes Trismegistos, the fourth is an allegedly ancient Egyptian philosophy - meaning the teaching of the Theologia Aristotelis wrongly attributed to Aristotle -, the fifth is Platonism. He had reconstructed, ordered and explained the four older philosophies. All five models are conducive to religion and acceptable from a Catholic perspective, in contrast to Aristotelianism, which is godless and incompatible with faith. The ancient Church Fathers had already recognized the conformity of Platonism with Christianity. Nevertheless, Aristotelian philosophy had prevailed. Their continued dominance goes back to the medieval scholastics. Plato's works were unknown to them, so they turned to the unsuitable writings of Aristotle.

In the preface, Patricius provocatively criticized the approach of the Counter-Reformation church, which tried to secure its belief in its teaching by means of censorship, the Inquisition and state violence. He strongly recommended that you rely on reason and the persuasiveness of philosophical arguments rather than relying on compulsion.

The first part of the script, entitled Panaugia (All-Brightness or All-Shine), deals with the principle of light, which is represented as the shaping and invigorating force in the universe, and with physical light and its properties. Among other things, the reflection and refraction of light and the nature of the colors are discussed. The second part is called Panarchia (Omnipotence or All-causality), a word derived the Greek noun archḗ ("origin", "cause", "rule"), which refers to the hierarchical world order and its divine source. The Panarchia describes the Emanationism - the gradual outflow of the entities from their divine source - and the hierarchy based on them in the universe. The third part is titled Pampsychia (All-souls). There the philosopher presents his concept of the soul of the entire physical cosmos through the world soul and particularly discusses the souls of animals. In the fourth part, the Pancosmia (All-order), topics of physical cosmology are discussed, in particular the question of the spatial expansion of the universe, which Patricius considers infinite.

In addition to the source texts, attached are two digression s by the author on special topics: an attempt to determine the order of Plato's dialogues and a compilation of contradictions between Aristotelian and Platonic philosophy. The source texts are Patricius's collection of fragments of the Chaldean oracles, hermetic literature and the Theologia Aristotelis, described as the "mystical philosophy of the Egyptians", a pseudo-Aristotelian script, the content of which is Patricius with only orally presented "unwritten teaching" equated to Plato. He said it was a record of Aristotle's wisdom teachings of ancient Egyptian origin, which Plato conveyed to his students in class.

Despite his great respect for the creators of the ancient wisdom teachings, Patricius did not hesitate to take a different view in individual cases. He stressed the need for valid evidence and refused to accept quotes from venerable authorities to replace missing arguments. He saw it as his task to provide arguments for what was not sufficiently founded in the traditional texts of the wise men of antiquity.

==== De numerorum mysteriis ====
According to the Pythagorean theory of numbers, the scripture De numerorum mysteriis (About the Secrets of Numbers), which Patricius commissioned in 1594 on behalf of the Cardinal Federico Borromeo wrote. It has been handed down in handwriting, but remained unchanged.

=== State theory, history theory and military science ===
==== La città felice ====
La città felice (The happy city) is a youth work by the philosopher, which he wrote as a student, completed in 1551 and had printed in Venice in 1553. The treatise is intended to show the conditions for a successful life in an ideal state community. The starting point is the relevant considerations in the Politics of Aristotle, the views of which the young humanist largely follows here. But there is something wrong the influence of Platonism can be seen. Material from Stoic literature is also used in the state model, and the influence of Niccolò Machiavelli s is also noticeable.

==== Della historia diece dialoghi ====
Patricius was one of the pioneers of History Theory, a young branch of research at that time. Ten dialogues of the Venetian scholar, which he published in 1560 under the title Della historia diece dialoghi, deal with the basics of History of philosophy and the methods of historical research. The fictional dialogues take place in Venice among friends and acquaintances of the author; he is always there. The participants in the speech represent and oppose different opinions. Her remarks are presented in a way that corresponds to a natural course of conversation, with frequent interruptions and digressions, with irony, doubt, ridicule and a wealth of witty remarks.

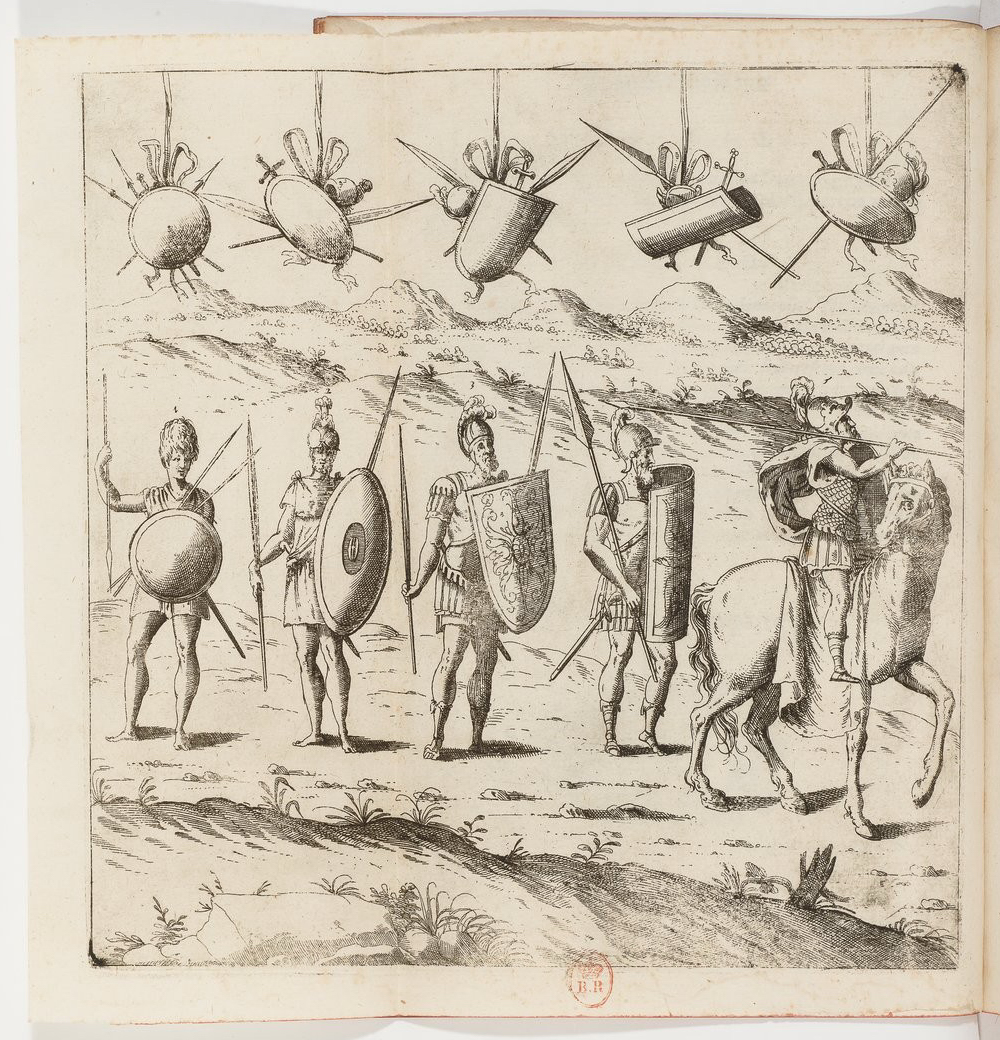
Roman Legionnaires and their weapons. Engraving in Patricius's writing La militia romana di Polibio, di Tito Livio, e di Dionigi Alicarnaseo, Ferrara 1583

==== La militia romana di Polibio, di Tito Livio, e di Dionigi Alicarnaseo ====
The treatise La militia romana di Polibio, di Tito Livio, e di Dionigi Alicarnaseo (The Roman warfare after Polybios, Titus Livius and Dionysius of Halicarnassus), which Patricius wrote in 1573, was not printed until ten years later. It is strongly inspired by Machiavelli's ideas. The starting point is the thesis that the art of war is the basis of peace and a prerequisite for human happiness. The decisive factor is the warfare of the ancient Romans, which is superior to all others, especially the Turkish. You have to stick to this model, because if you can regain the old Roman clout, you no longer have to fear the Turks. The only one who has almost succeeded so far is Duke Alfonso I d'Este, who as a general, as well as in siege technology and in fortress construction, is the unmatched role model of all other rulers. With this flattery, Patricius wanted to impress Duke Alfonso II d'Este, grandson of Alfonso I, who was then ruling in Ferrara. He dedicated his writing to him.

==== Paralleli militari ====
The Paralleli militari (Military Comparisons), printed in two parts in 1594 and 1595, are Patricius's last publication. They take stock of his considerations in the face of the political and military crisis in Italy in the late 16th century. He claimed to be able to use his theory of warfare to instruct the military in their own field. For this purpose, he sent his writing to the well-known military commanders Ferrante Gonzaga, Francesco Maria II Della Rovere and Alfonso II D'Este.

=== Literary studies ===
==== Discorso della diversità de 'furori poetici ====
The Discorso della diversità de 'furori poetici (treatise on the diversity of poetic emotions), a 1553 printed youth work by Patricius, deals with the origin and the different products of poetic inspiration. The author deals with the controversial relationship between inspired work in a state of emotion and learned engineering techniques based on traditional norms and patterns. According to the concept of the Discorso, the inspired poet is a creator who follows his inspiration without being bound by rules; his art cannot be learned, but is a divine gift. Following the poetics of the Roman poet Horace, the humanist theorist assumes that "ingegno" and "furore" work together in poetic production. By "ingegno" he means individual inclination, talent, and here especially mental agility, by "furore" the inspiration from the divine Muses. Thanks to the interplay of these factors, the poet gains a privileged relationship with the deity, which makes him appear sick and crazy from the perspective of people without understanding. However, Patricius admits that the reception of foreign works, learning and practice could also make a contribution to success .

==== Lettura sopra il sonetto del Petrarca "La gola, e'l sonno, e l'ociose piume" ====
This font is also one of Patricius's youth works printed as early as 1553. Here he analyzes the sonnet La gola, e'l sonno, e l'ociose piume of the famous poet Francesco Petrarca from a philosophical perspective, giving it a symbolic meaning in the context of the Platonic Soul Doctrine.

==== Della retorica dialoghi dieci ====
Patricius's ten dialogues on rhetoric were printed in Venice in 1562. They are dedicated to Cardinal Niccolò Sfondrati, who later became Pope Gregory XIV. Each dialogue is named after one of the participants. The author himself is involved in all discussions. The scripture turns against the opinion widespread in humanist circles, based on the view of Aristotle and Ciceros, that rhetoric is an art of conviction that is necessary for any knowledge transfer. Patricius sees this as an overestimation of this discipline, which he regards as a means of deception and is viewed with skepticism. He describes it as a mere technique of dealing with linguistic means of expression without any internal relation to truth and reality. Since the principle of rhetoric is unknown and because it deals with the probable and not with the true, it cannot be called science at the current state of knowledge, although the possibility of future scientific rhetoric remains open.

Other topics of rhetoric writing are the origin of language and the power of words. The author believes that the spoken word had a magical power in a mythical past. The later introduced control of the minds with the art of persuasion was only a cheatechoes of this original power, because the former connection with the truth had been lost to humanity. Patricius draws a cultural pessimistic image of human history, emphasizing fear as a decisive factor that led to the deplorable state of civilization in his time and dominated social life. In the context of this decline he categorizes the origins and history of rhetoric.

==== Parere in difesa dell'Ariosto ====
The appearance of the final version of Torquato Tassos epic Jerusalem Delivered in 1581 sparked lively controversy in Ferrara. Admirers Tassos faced a group of literary critics for whom Ariosts Orlando Furioso was the authoritative pattern. After the poet Camillo Pellegrino made a pejorative statement about Ariost's fabric treatment, Patricius intervened in 1585 with a pamphlet. In his statement, entitled Parere in difesa dell'Ariosto, he praised Ariost's independence, who neither mimicked the epics Homer s nor followed the rules of Aristotle's poetics. Based on the current controversy, Patricius wanted to show the uselessness of the established Aristotelian poetry. He claimed, among other things, that Homer, like Ariost, had not adhered to the rules of this poetics. Tasso immediately responded with a reply in which he defended the conventional principles.

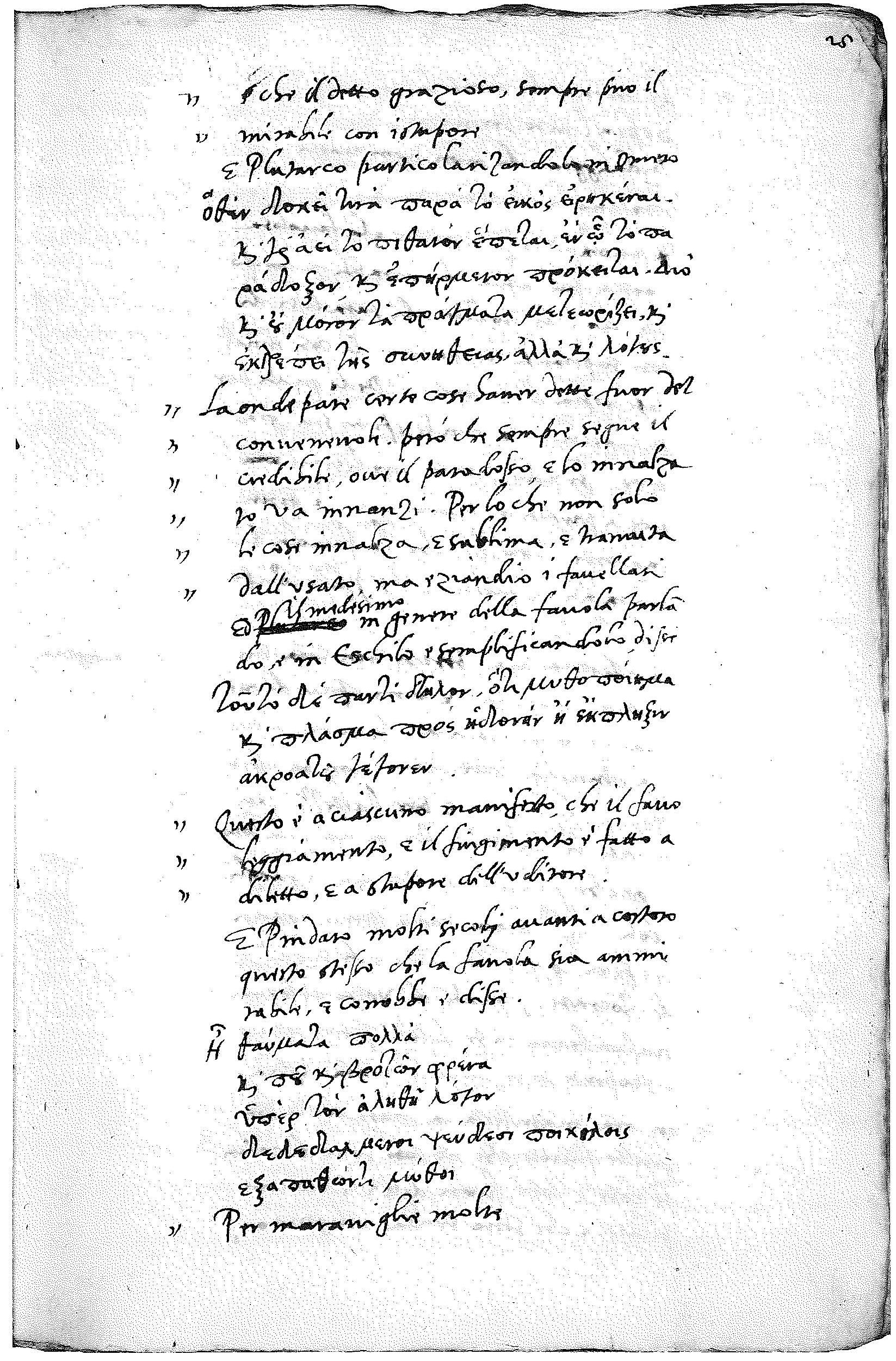
A page from Patricius's handwritten manuscript of Poetica. Parma, Biblioteca Palatina, Pal. 408, fol. 25r

==== Poetica ====
The Poetica is a large-scale representation of Patricius's poetry theory, an alternative to Aristotle's Poetics. It comprises seven volumes, called decades, because they each consist of ten books. The first two decades, the Deca istoriale and the Deca disputata, were printed in 1586. The Deca istoriale offers a detailed description of the poetic products of antiquity and the forms of their public reception. The inventory is followed by the classification, the examination of Metrik and the presentation of the presentation of poetry in cultural life. One of the theses put forward here is that the actors had always sung at the Tragedy Performances in ancient Greece. The second decade deals with theory. It concludes with a discussion of Torquato Tasso's understanding of poetic quality. Patricius called this part of his work Trimerone (three-day work) because it had taken three days to draft. The remaining five decades, which were lost in the early modern period, were only discovered in 1949 and published in 1969/1971.

==== Controversy with Jacopo Mazzoni ====
Patricius had an intensive discussion with the scholar Jacopo Mazzoni, who contradicted him on a philological question. It was about the lost work Daphnis oder Lityerses by the Hellenistic poet Sositheus, which was probably a satire. Patricius wrongly believed that Daphnis and Lityerses were the titles of two tragedies of Sositheos, while Mazzoni - also falsely - assumed that it was an Eclogue with the title Daphnis and Lityerses. Patricius responded to Mazzoni's criticism of his hypothesis in 1587 with a reply, the Risposta di Francesco Patricius a due opposizioni fattegli dal Signor Giacopo Mazzoni (response to two objections by Mr Jacopo Mazzoni), to which Mazzoni published a reply, to which Patricius replied with a new replica, the Difesa di Francesco Patricius dalle cento accuse dategli dal Signor Iacopo Mazzoni (Francesco Patricius's defense against the hundred accusations made against him by Mr Jacopo Mazzoni).

=== Writings on love ===
==== Discorsi et argomenti on Luca Contile's sonnets ====
Patricius was friends with the poet Luca Contile. When he published an edition of his friend's collected poetic works in Venice in 1560, he added his discorsi et argomenti, introductory and explanatory texts, in which he laid out a philosophical basis for the love poetry. He continued the treatment of the subject of Erost in Plato's dialogue Symposium and transferred to his revered friend Tarquinia Molza the role of Plato's famous literary figure Diotima, who had the essential knowledge mediated through love. He compared the ancient love poem with that of the Renaissance. After dealing with the theory, he went into the poetic implementation of philosophical thoughts and commented on fifty sonnets Contiles.

==== Il Delfino overo Del bacio ====
When Patricius wrote the dialogue Il Delfino overo Del bacio (Delfino or About the Kiss) is controversial. He did not publish it; the work was not made available in print until 1975, when the critical first edition appeared. The interlocutors are the author and an angelo Delfino, after whom the work is named, which cannot be identified with certainty. Delfino is probably a member of the important Venetian noble family of the Dolfin. The starting point is a question that the young Delfino asks the patrician who lives in seclusion: he wants to know what is causing the "sweetness" of the kiss. He found nothing about it in love literature; she ignores the kiss as if it were irrelevant to love. The two men discuss the different types of kissing and their effects, and Patricius gives a detailed explanation that satisfies the questioner. He goes into the different erotic sensibilities of individual parts of the body and rehabilitates the sense of touch that has been dismissed by Marsilio Ficino. Finally, the grateful Delfino sends a prayer to the "exceedingly powerful" god of love Amor.

==== L'amorosa filosofia ====
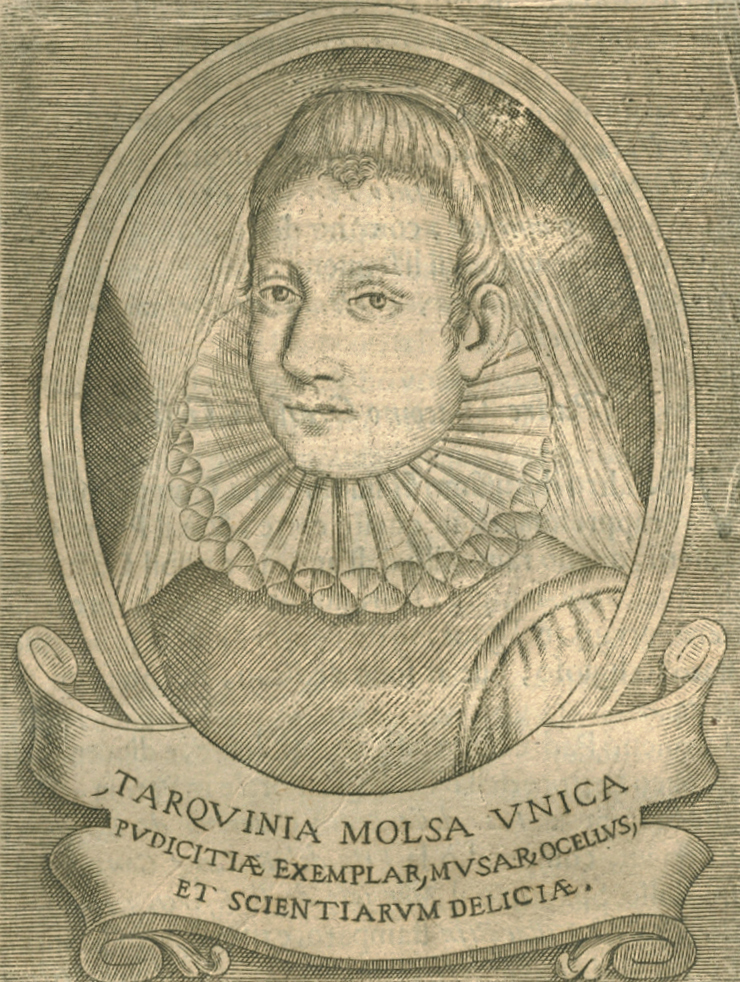
Tarquinia Molza

L'amorosa filosofia is a writing about female attractiveness and love, which Patricius wrote in Modena in 1577 but did not publish.

=== Water management ===
In 1578/1579 Patricius dealt with a water management and, at the same time, a political question. The occasion was a serious problem on the lower reaches of the Po, on the bank of which is Ferrara. After a devastating flood of the river Reno, it was channeled in 1442 and led into the Po. The melioration measure was in the interest of the city damaged by the flood, Bologna, which the Reno flows past. In the opinion of the Ferrarese, however, it was the cause of the landing, which severely impaired shipping in its area on the Po. Therefore, the rulers of Ferrara in the 15th and 16th centuries reluctantly consented to the introduction of Reno water into the Po or refused to grant it. For this reason, a new conflict between the two cities arose in the 1570s, in which Pope Gregory XIII took over the mediation.

The Pope set up a commission of inquiry in which Scipione di Castro, a political advisor without engineering skills, set the tone. Di Castro wrote an expert opinion in 1578, in which he came to the conclusion that the landing was not caused by the Reno. This angered the Ferrarese, for whom Patricius took the floor after extensive studies. He first formulated and justified his opinion in a report drawn up in 1579 for Duke Alfonso II d'Este, the Discorso sopra lo stato del Po di Ferrara (treatise on the condition of the Po of Ferrara), and then in a damning opinion on the document of Castro, the Risposta alla scrittura di D. Scipio di Castro sopra l'arrenamento del Po di Ferrara. His contact on the part of the Curia was the Bishop Tommaso Sanfelice, with whom he could communicate well. In 1580, Patricius wrote a report on his negotiations with Sanfelice. However, the Duke did not take up his bold proposals for the construction of new canals.

=== Il Barignano ===
Patricius treated an ethical topic in 1553 in the collection of early works Dialogo dell'honore (Dialogue on Honor), which he named Il Barignano. The namesake is Fabio Barignano, a contemporary poet from Pesaro who was still very young at that time, and who appears as one of the two participants in the fictional discussion. His interlocutor is also a historical figure, the Count Giovan Giacomo Leonardi, a diplomat in the service of the Duke of Urbino. In the dedication letter, Patricius notes that honor is very important to everyone. Even the worst person wanted to be respected everywhere and held to be honorable and took revenge for insult and slander. Nevertheless, no one has ever dedicated a script to honor and examined philosophically what it actually consists of. Only one special aspect, the duel, has so far been discussed in the literature. The Barignano should remedy this deficiency. During the conversation, Leonardi conveys his young dialogue partner his understanding of true honor. According to him, this does not consist in prestige, but in an unshakable onevirtuous basic attitude. Therefore, one can never lose true honor, which does not depend on the judgments of others, in contrast to the theory of pretense, an ephemeral reputation based on external values and questionable ideas.

=== Poems ===
Patricius wrote two poems of praise from the late 1550s. He also glorified the painter Irene di Spilimbergo in two sonnets after her early death.

The first of the two poems of praise, L'Eridano (Der Po), was created when the philosopher unsuccessfully sought employment at the court of the Duke of Ferrara, Ercole II D'Este, tried. It was intended to show the ruler the humanistic qualifications of the author and at the same time to impress with the usual flattery. Patricius dedicated the poem, in which he praised the ruling family, to a duke's brother, the cardinal Ippolito d'Este. He had it printed in 1557 and included an explanation of the verse form, the Sostentamenti del nuovo verso heroico. As in other fields, he also appeared as an innovator here: he claimed that he was introducing a new heroic measure into Italian poetry that matched the heroic content of an epic. These are thirteen silbler with a caesura after the sixth syllable, a form recreated from the classic hexameter. In reality, this measure, which probably goes back to the Alexandrine, was not new, it was already used in the 14th century.

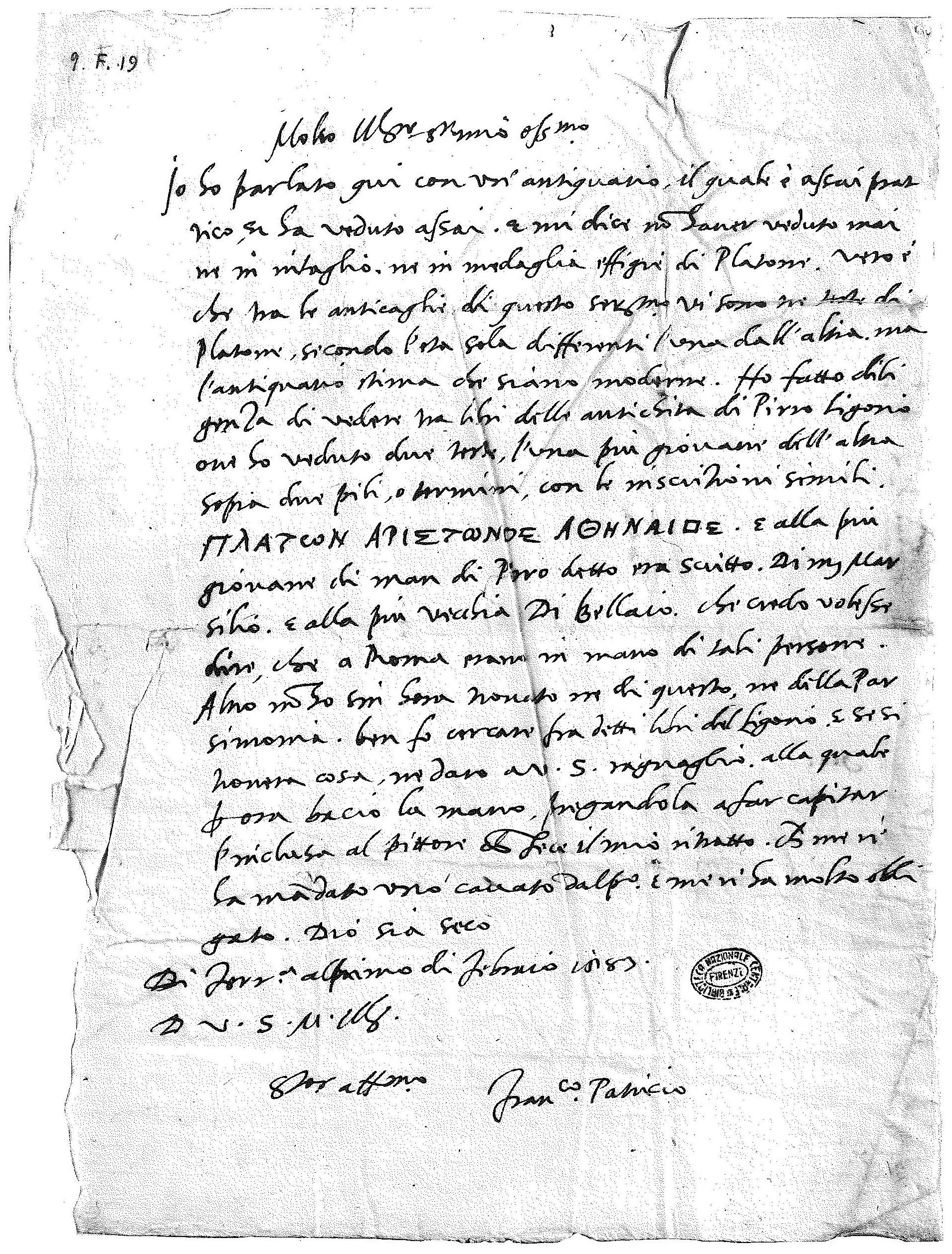
An autograph letter from Patricius to Baccio Valori from 1 February 1583. Florence, Biblioteca Nazionale Centrale, Filze Rinuccini 19, fol. 9r

The second poem of praise, the Badoaro, was written in 1558 and is also written in the "new" heroic measure. Patricius praises the Venetian humanist, politician and diplomat Federico Badoer. The long-lost text was only published in 1981.

=== Letters ===
Around a hundred letters from Patricius have survived, including a letter of 26 June 1572 to Bernardino Telesio, which is particularly important as a source, in which he critically examines his philosophical principles, and an autobiographical letter to his friend Baccio Valori, dated 12 January 1587. They make up only a modest part of his correspondence and largely date from the years in Ferrara and Rome; all letters from adolescence are lost. The style is factual and dry, without literary jewelry. This source material shows the scholar as an important figure in the cultural life of his era.

=== Del governo de 'regni ===
According to a hypothesis by John-Theophanes Papademetriou, which is considered plausible, Patricius printed in Ferrara in 1583 the Italian translation of an oriental fairy-tale collection under the title Del governo de 'regni'. The template was a Greek version of this work, which originated in India and is known as the Panchatantra or Kalīla wa Dimna.

== Teaching ==
With his teachings in different subject areas, Patricius wanted to distinguish himself as a critic of traditional ways of thinking and finder of new ways. He preferred to differentiate himself from all previous developments and chose an unusual approach, which he - sometimes exaggerating - presented as a fundamental innovation. He sought to broaden the horizons and go beyond the usual limits. In doing so, he came across one of the main obstacles that he tried to remove: the relatively rigid housing of Aristotelism, which dominated in school philosophy, which had developed over the centuries through the extensive Aristotle commentary and allowed innovation only within a predetermined, narrow framework. In view of this situation, the humanist's polemic was directed not only against Aristotle, but also against the scholastic tradition shaped by Aristotelian thinking and in particular against its Averroistic current. He accused Aristotelians and scholastics of dealing with words - abstractions introduced arbitrarily and without reason - rather than things and having lost all contact with the reality of nature.

In general, Patricius's philosophy is characterized by the priority of the deductive approach. He derived his theses from premise n, the correctness of which he considered evident. In doing so, he aspired to be scientific, based on the model of mathematical discourse. The goal was knowledge of the whole existing through order (rerum universitas) through an understanding of structures. Patricius justified his rejection of Aristotelian reasoning by saying that it failed in relation to contingents. His approach should remedy this shortcoming; he wanted to systematize the contingent and thereby make it capable of science.

=== Metaphysics, natural philosophy and mathematics ===
In natural philosophy, Patricius emphasized the novelty of his teaching; he stated that he was announcing "great things" and "outrageous things." In fact, he made a fundamental break with the medieval and early modern scholastic tradition.

==== Space concept ====
In scholastic physics based on Aristotelian standards, which still prevailed in the 16th century, spatial concept was bound to the concept of location. The place was conceived as a kind of vessel that could absorb the body and constitute the space. The idea of a three-dimensional space that existed independently of places as a reality of its own was missing.

Patricius opposed this way of thinking with his new spatial concept. According to his understanding, space is neither a substance nor an accident, and it cannot be integrated into the Aristotelian category scheme. It is also not a "nothing" or similar to the non-being, but an actual being something, namely the first being in the world of the sensible. The being of space precedes all other physical being temporally and ontologically: it is the prerequisite for its existence. If the world perished, space nonetheless would exist, not only potentially, but actually. As something, space is qualitatively determined; its characteristics are receptivity, three-dimensionality and homogeneity. It is indifferent to what is in it. Considered in and of itself, it is equivalent to the vacuum. On the one hand, physical space is physical because it has three dimensions like a body; on the other hand, it is non-physical because it does not offer any resistance.

==== Philosophy of Mathematics ====
With the "new geometry" that Patricius proposed, he meant a new philosophical foundation of this science. He justified their necessity with an inadequacy of the Euclidean system: Euclid had defined elementary terms such as point, line and area, but had failed to develop a philosophical system that would allow the other geometric terms to be determined correctly. Above all, Euclid does not have a definition of space, although space must be the primary object of geometry. Patricius tried to remedy this deficiency by making space the basis of his own system and deriving points, lines, angles, surfaces and bodies from it.

In Patricius's understanding, the continuum is a real fact, while the discrete is a product of thought. This gave him the primacy of geometry over mathematics over arithmetic. This view corresponded to the state of knowledge at that time; the analytical geometry, which extends the concept of number and makes it continuous, has not yet been discovered.

==== Cosmology and world origin ====
According to Aristotelian cosmology, the world of material things enclosed by the spherical vault of heaven forms the whole of the universe. Nothing can be outside of this limited universe, not even time and empty space. Patricius, on the other hand, considered that part of the three-dimensional space that he imagined contains all of the matter to be a delimited area surrounded by empty space. The question of the form of this area remained open. The Aristotelian assumption that the material world is spherical was viewed with skepticism by Patricius, since no proof of the spherical shape of the sky had been provided. Apparently he preferred the hypothesis that the material part of the universe takes the form of a regular tetrahedron s hat. In the middle of the material world, according to his model, is the earth, which rotates about its axis every day. He did not consider the counter-hypothesis, a daily rotation of the celestial vault around the earth, to be plausible, since the required speed was hardly possible. He rejected the conventional explanation of the movements of the heavenly bodies, according to which the stars are attached to transparent material spheres (sphere n), whose revolutions they follow. Instead, he assumed that they were moving freely in the room. For him, the traditional idea that the orbits were circular also fell away. Therefore, he also gave up the concept of the Sphere Harmony, which has been widespread since ancient times, which presupposes physical spheres. However, he held on to the idea of a harmonious structure of the cosmos in the sense of the Platonic natural philosophy. The appearance of a new star, the Supernova from 1572, he took the opportunity to declare Aristotle's claim that the sky is unchangeable and imperishable to be refuted.

In Patricius's model, the material world is surrounded by an infinitely extended, homogeneous, empty space. This is flooded with light; an empty room must be bright because the light is everywhere where there is no material that could create darkness with its impenetrability. The space that encompasses the material world already existed before the creation of matter, which then in put him in. With this hypothesis, the humanist thinker contradicted Aristotelian teaching, according to which a vacuum is in principle impossible. He also accepted vacuums within the physical world; these are tiny empty spaces between the particles of matter. He saw one of several proofs of the existence of such vacuums in the condensation processes, in which, in his opinion, the empty spaces are filled.

In cosmogony, the doctrine of the origin of the world, Patricius adopted the basic principles of the Neoplatonic Emanationism, which represents the creation of everything created as a gradual emergence from a divine source. He used the ideas of the Chaldean Oracles and the Hermetics.

In contrast to Aristotle, Patricius assumed a temporal beginning of the world. According to his teaching, the creation of the cosmos is not an arbitrary act of God, but a necessity. It inevitably results from God's nature, which demands creation. God must create. As creator, he is the source, the first principle in which everything has its origin. This source is called "the one" in Neoplatonism. Patricius used his own word creation for this: un'omnia ("One-Everything").

According to the model of the "new philosophy", the first product of the creation process is the spatial principle, the indifferent, neutral principle of the local. Its existence is the prerequisite for everything else, for the unfolding of nature. The starting point of nature is the second principle, the "light". This does not mean light as a natural phenomenon and the object of sensory perception, but a supra-objective natural condition, the generating principle of form, which is also the principle of knowing and being recognized. From this light emerge, in a continuous process, which are metaphorically referred to as the "seeds" of things. These are introduced through the "heat" (Latin calor) into the "flow" or the "moisture" (Latin "fluor"), a flexible substrate, from which the preforms are made of world things, their patterns. All of this is not yet material; the first emanation processes take place in a purely intellectual area. In this context, terms such as fluor and calor are only used to illustrate the non-illustrative. By fluor we mean the continuity principle, which creates the connection between the different elementary areas, forces and designs. At the same time, fluorine is the passive principle of taking up form and Factor that gives the bodies the resilience needed to maintain their mutual delimitation. The "warmth" represents an active principle, it is the dynamic unfolding of the light principle in the fluor.

Thus the four basic principles "space", "light", "flowing" and "warmth" are the basis of the cosmos. The material world emerges from them. They form a complex ideal unity that is inherent in all material existence and precedes it as a condition of existence. On the material level, the principle of fluorine is shown in the form of the relative "liquid" of the material objects. This means their different degrees of density. These are the cause of the different resistance of physical bodies, their hardness or softness.

This cosmology also has an epistemological aspect. If the physical universe depends on the generating principle of light, it is light-like. Accordingly, from Patricius's perspective, nature does not appear to be impenetrable, alien and dark matter, but is in itself clear, it manifests itself. Its clarity does not have to be set and produced by the human observer. Accordingly, there can be no fundamental, unsolvable problem of natural knowledge.

==== Concept of time ====
When examining time, Patricius dealt with Aristotle's definition, which he subjected to fundamental criticism. Aristotle made several mistakes at the same time by defining that time is "the number or measure of movement by means of earlier or later". He had made the measure and number, which are the products of human thought, essential to the inherent fact of nature, as if a thought of man gave being to a natural thing. In reality, time exists without any measurement or count. In addition, Aristotle only took movement into account and ignored standstill or rest. It is not time that measures movement, but movement that time. Movement and measurement are not even essential for human perception of time. Even the "earlier" and "later" of things subject to the passage of time are not part of the essence of time. Rather, time is nothing more than the duration of the body.

According to this understanding, time cannot be ontologically equal to space. Since it is determined as the duration of bodies, but the existence of bodies presupposes that of space, time must be subordinate to space, the primary given, and also to the bodies.

=== Anthropology ===
In the Pampsychia, the third part of the Nova de universis philosophia, Patricius dealt with the determination of the specifically human through demarcation from the animal. There he dealt with the animus, the invigorating and enabling body in the cosmos and especially in living things. He came to the conclusion that there was no inherently irrational animus. In doing so, he turned against the popular opinion that the animals had an irrational soul. In his understanding, rationality is not a peculiarity of man, but is more or less pronounced in the animal world. The empirical finding does not allow a fundamental delimitation of the rational from the irrational, rather the differences between the species with regard to rationality are only gradual.

It also makes no sense to use the speech act - defined as "uttered in words" - as a demarcation characteristic of humans, because there is no fundamental discontinuity in this regard either. The utterances of the animals are means of communication that are part of their languages, and their functions are analogous to human languages. The animals were also given a certain level of cognition, which enabled them to act in a targeted manner, and they had reason (ratiocinium), because they were able to meaningfully exchange individual memories with new ones To link perceptions, and that is the activity of the mind. The special position of man rests only on his ability to gain deep insight into causal relationships with the intellect and on the immortality of his soul. In the writing La gola, e'l sonno, e l'ociose piume, Patricius cited the characteristic of the specifically human in addition to access to knowledge that goes beyond what is perceived by the senses, the impulse control.

Like all Neoplatonists, Patricius dealt intensively with the relationship between the spiritual (intelligible) and the sensually perceptible world. In the hierarchical order of his system, the material sphere is subordinate to the spiritual in every respect, since it is its image and product. The spiritual, as the higher level, is the simpler and closer to the divine origin, the sensually perceptible appears in the variety of the individual sensory objects and the complexity of the physical world. Each of the two spheres is graduated in itself, whereby the simpler is always the superior in rank and power. The relatively simple is always the all-encompassing at the same time, since it produces the relatively complex and varied. Within this order of all reality, man takes a middle position. He forms the lowest level of expression in the spiritual world, because his intellect is the spiritual form that connects its unity with the greatest degree of diversity. At the same time, he is the highest level of existence in the field of beings bound to a physical substrate, since he is the only one with an intellect.

With regard to the classification of the soul in this system, Patricius's view agrees with the teachings of Plotinus, the founder of Neoplatonism. This is about the controversial question among the Neo-Platonists, whether the soul, through its descent into the physical world, surrenders completely to the material circumstances, as the late antique Neo-Platonists meant, or whether Plotinus could maintain its presence in the spiritual world at any time. Patriciuss is convinced that the human soul has no non-rational or suffering life in itself, but only a life of knowledge; the impulsiveness, the irrational is a result of the physicality, which it encounters from the outside.

=== History and state theory ===
==== The draft state utopia ====
With his youth work La città felice Patricius presented a state model based on Aristotle's Political Theory Utopian. At that time, the Aristotelian guidelines were still decisive for him.

The starting point is the determination of the human goal in life. For the author, as a Christian, this can only be the attainment of the highest good, the future bliss in the hereafter. The hope of this maintains man in need of his earthly existence. However, there must also be a provisional goal on this side: the creation of advantageous living conditions that encourage higher aspirations. For Patricius, like for other humanists, the optimum that can be achieved in earthly existence is the felicità, the happiness that he, like ancient Peripatetics and Stoics, does with the practice of virtue (operazione della virtù). The state that as city-state in the sense of the ancient polis and the Italian city-republic, the task is to create and guarantee stable framework conditions for this. The happiness of the city is the sum of the happiness of its citizens. This presupposes the opportunity to be happy.

On a social level, the needs arising from the natural love for life in community must be met. On an individual level, it is about carefully maintaining the bond that connects soul and body, maintaining the spirit of life by fulfilling the physical needs. First of all, the physical must be guaranteed; The conditions include favorable climatic conditions and an adequate supply of water and food. If these basic requirements are met, community and public life can be optimized. This requires that citizens know and interact with one another, for example through meals together, and in particular that they connect with one another through educational aspirations and intellectual exchange. To make this possible, the citizenship must not exceed a certain size. Furthermore, the social and class structural inequality among the citizens must be kept within limits; the state should provide public meeting places and the legislation should counter private hostilities. Patricius's central demands are the temporal limitation of the exercise of power and the free access of every citizen to the highest state offices. This is to prevent tyrannis chem or oligarchical abuse of power. External security is guaranteed by the citizens themselves, not by mercenaries.

Patricius believes religious cult, rites and a priesthood to satisfy a basic human need are necessary, "temples and churches" are to be built and "the gods" are worshiped. The religion of the "happy city" is not described in any more detail, in any case it does not have a specifically Christian character.

A particularly important state goal is the education of children to virtue. Legislators must ensure that they are not exposed to bad influences. Great emphasis is placed on the musical education of the youth. The teaching in music and painting has a propaedeutic function with regard to later philosophical activity.

According to the state theory of Aristotle, the population of the city-state is divided into classes. Only the upper classes, the ruling class, form the citizens with political rights. The members of the lower classes - farmers, artisans and traders - are busy with their hard work to secure their livelihood and have no opportunity to achieve the happiness they are striving for in the "happy city". According to the author, they are naturally not predisposed to and not capable of doing this. Their arduous existence is a prerequisite for the well-being of the upper class. - With regard to the inevitability of oppression, the young patrician followed the guidelines of Aristotle, who reserved the possibility of a successful life for an elite and saw a natural condition in such social conditions. This view was widespread in the Italian educational class to which Patricius belonged.

==== The evaluation of the forms of government ====
When comparing the different forms of government, Patricius came to the conclusion that a balanced republican mixed constitution was superior to all alternatives. One should neither entrust too much power to an individual nor paralyze the state through radical democratization. The rule of a small group spurred ambition too much, which could lead to civil wars. Optimal is the Mixed Constitution of the Republic of Venice, in which aspects of the different forms of government are combined. There, the element of individual rule is represented by the office of Doge, the principle of the rule of a small elite is enforced by the Senate and the idea of everyone's participation is taken into account by the establishment of the Grand Council.

==== Establishing interest in history ====
As in his state utopia, Patricius also uses his determination of the human aim in life as happiness (felicità) when dealing with history. According to his teaching, this has three aspects: mere being as successful self-preservation, eternal being as a union with the deity and being "in a good way" (bene essere), successful life in a social context. Looking at history is about studying human striving for being "good" in this sense. The philosopher turns to his discussion of the historical dimension of life.

The need for happiness in the sense of this good being arises according to Patricius's finding of sensuality and thus the area of Affekt e. Man is a sensual, passionate being. The affects are primary facts and are in themselves neither commendable nor blameworthy, but they create the possibility of behavior to which praise or blame can be referred. Whether or not you can achieve the bene essere depends on whether you learn to properly deal with your passions. A person's work on himself begins with behavior towards his own affinity, and only there can "good being" be the goal. According to Patricius, the passions do not come into play inside the individual without cause, but always ignite in the encounter with other people and always aim to have a certain effect on others. The right relationship with them can only be gained and consolidated through practice in the community. Good being through mastering passions proves to be identical with ethical behavior in social life, in the family and in the state.

This is where the time dimension comes into play for Patricius. The community is determined not only by the present, but also by its history. Therefore, dealing with the social challenge must include the entire past, which shows itself as history. A human being living only in the present would be exposed to his affects like an animal. What prevents him from doing so is confrontation with the past. Only history opens up the field in which the individual has to face up to his social task and can prove himself through his ethical behavior. A constructive reference to the present is established through the analysis and awareness of the past.

==== The criticism of the traditional approaches of historians ====
The idea that the purpose of dealing with history was to exemplify the validity of moral teachings and to visualize inspiring or dissuasive patterns has been widespread since ancient times. Even in the Renaissance, numerous authors had endorsed this view, including the well-known humanist Giovanni Pontano and Patricius's teacher Francesco Robortello. In this way, the consideration of history was placed in the service of moral education and subordinated to its purposes. This made her the poet and the rhetoricik approximated, which should also aim at educational returns. In addition, a gripping, entertaining, literary narrative was expected from historian as well as from the poet or speaker. As a result, the differences between historical reporting and fictional literature became blurred, for example in the speeches of statesmen and generals invented by historians.

Patricius rigorously opposed this way of dealing with historical materials, which had been common for thousands of years, although he ultimately also pursued an ethical goal and enthusiastically affirmed the role model function of great figures from the past. Like his predecessors, he emphasized the practical use of historical knowledge in civil life and above all in politics. His novelty, however, was that he insisted on a consistent separation between finding the truth and moral instruction or use, and condemned every decoration. In doing so, he attacked the famous historians Thucydides and Livius, whom he accused of having invented alleged speeches that would never have been given in this way. According to his concept, the lessons to be learned from history are knowledge, which is not mediated through rhetorical language art, but is to be acquired through reflection and contemplation based on the facts ascertained by the historian.

According to Patricius's reasoning, the concept of historiography, which has been common since ancient times, is based on a contradictory relationship to the subject of consideration. The starting point of his considerations can be summarized as follows: The historians theoretically admit to the ideal that historians are obliged to be impartial and to strictly adhere to the truth. However, it is obvious that this is hardly ever the case in practice, because the historians' accounts contradict each other on countless points. Furthermore, there are important obstacles to fulfilling the claim to truth: Because of the obvious subjectivity of perceptions and points of view and the inadequacy of the source-based tradition, historians have only a very limited access to historical reality. At best, they can determine the results of the historical events somewhat correctly, while the circumstances, the background and causes remain in the dark. The actual relationships are only known to the respective actors, but they lack the impartiality required for a truthful presentation. Only impartial eyewitnesses are really reliable, but such rapporteurs are usually not available. The neutral historian has no access to the information that he would actually need for his work.

For Patricius, the train of thought can now be continued like this: A representative of the conventional moralizing, rhetorically embellishing presentation of history may concede, because of the weak points mentioned, that the pure truth must remain hidden. However, he will assert that a rough approximation is still possible. One has to put up with not being able to illuminate the background. This concession will not seem too serious to him, because from his perspective the historical truth is irrelevant anyway. He thinks that historical knowledge is not in itself worth striving for, but only as a means for the purpose of instruction that ultimately serves the actual goal of obtaining bliss.

This is where the decisive counter argument comes in, with which Patricius wants to refute the view he is attacking. It reads: A moral poetic invention - such as the epics of Homer and Virgil s - can produce the desired moral yield as well as a historical work, the truth with Ersomixes. Thus, if one resigns in finding the truth and only holds on to the educational effect, the difference between poetry and historiography is eliminated. Historicity loses its intrinsic value and thus historical research loses its meaning. Then you can - according to Patricius - do without historical studies and instead teach bliss with any fables.

==== The concept of scientific history research ====
Patricius countered the criticism of history with his opposite conviction, according to which the historical researcher's sole aim is to know the historical truth and to find the facts as a contribution to the bene essere is of significant value. According to this concept, objectivity and certainty must be achieved to the extent that is possible for the human mind. In such work, standards of morality are out of the question, there is no question of good or bad. The evaluation of what happened is important, but it is on a different page and has to be done in a different context, from a different perspective. Patricius rejected the connection between philosophy and historiography, as it did for example Polybios; In his opinion, the historian should not philosophize about the hidden causes of the course of history, but only with facts - including the recognizable motives of actors - deal.

As the subject of historical scientific research in this sense, Patricius determined the documented and remembered processes in the world of the sensible in their entirety. He called them "effetti" ("effects"), by which he meant the individual concrete realities over time. It is the singular and contingent facts that enter through the senses and are then processed by the mind and assigned to their reasons. They are effects in contrast to the general causes and purely spiritual conditions with which philosophy deals. The work of the historian is not limited to the collection and documentation of the effetti; rather, he can also use meticulous research to determine the reasons for their origin, to recognize the intentions and motives behind them. The possibility to explain the empirical historical facts causally justifies the claim of historical research to be a science.

According to this definition of the research object, the historian's field of work is the universal history of the empirically found. Patricius thus opposed the usual limitation to the actions of people and the further narrowing of the field of vision to the deeds of kings, statesmen and generals. From his point of view, the universal history also extends beyond the human world to the processes in nature, that is, the natural history. He also called for the full inclusion of cultural history, that is, intellectual achievements, technical achievements, discoveries of unknown countries and peoples, and the history of individual estates such as artisans, farmers, and shipmen. The Constitutional History deserves special attention; Always ask about the cause of constitutional changes. Patricius considered the intellectual history, which deals with ideas, ideas, opinions and attitudes (concetti dell'animo), to be more important than the history of deeds. In addition to customs and customs, he also included products such as clothing, structures and ships, as well as all devices manufactured for work and everyday life, as relevant in terms of cultural history.

Patricius also called for economic history to be included, which historians had completely neglected. Without considering the economic and financial situation of a state, the representation of its history is empty and airy, because the economy is the basis for the life of every community. Precise information on the state budget is important.

Another field that Patricius has complained about so far is peace research. He remarked that he had never heard of a history of peace, even though this area in particular would be a particularly worthwhile topic.

==== The method ====
With regard to the method, Patricius insisted on clear criteria of source criticism. One shouldn't rely on any established authority, but rather to check everything oneself. Even the agreement of the information of several authors is not proof of the correctness, it could also be a mere rumor. The best sources are the accounts of historians who themselves were involved in the events. However, they would have to be compared with representations from the opponent's perspective. Secondly, other contemporary reports are relatively credible. Third is information from authors who wrote about the past, but who should nevertheless be given a certain amount of expertise because they themselves belonged to the people in question. Patricius cautioned particularly with historians who report on foreign peoples and deal with events that were long ago. In his opinion, the value of general historical works such as World Chronicle only lies in the fact that the processing of the compiled material from older sources can be examined. One must always ask oneself what expertise the respective rapporteur could have had, to what extent he could be expected to be impartial and what should be said about his guarantors. Patricius annalistic sources are considered to be particularly reliable, provided they are in the original, unadulterated version. In addition, one should pay due attention to the texts created without the intention of tradition, according to the terminology of modern historical science.

Patricius compared the historian's penetration from the circumstances of the action to the cause of the action by separating the individual onion skins, which gradually leads to the core of the onion. He also used the metaphor of the anatomist, which is similar to that of the historian. Like the anatomist with the body, the historian has to deal with the action he is investigating. Every action has a main actor (principal attore), the reason for which must be revealed by cutting.

==== The story of the future ====
The determination of the object of investigation as a whole of the temporal processes led Patricius to assume that historical research could even be extended to the future. He considered it fundamentally possible to write a story of the future, that is, to make serious scientific forecasts based on recognized laws. The background was his understanding of the statesman's art, according to which it relies on the ability to anticipate and achieve what is not yet. Accordingly, a ruler empowered to do so would be able to keep records of the correctly foreseen. Then a story of the future lies in the realm of the imaginable.

==== The military system ====
Patricius paid particular attention to the military. He found it unsatisfactory to show the military forces of a state only through reports of battles, conquests, sieges, victories or defeats. Rather, an understanding of the military organization is necessary. You need precise knowledge of the structure and management of the armed forces, weapons, ammunition and Besoldung.

Following Machiavelli, Patricius extensively criticized the use of foreign mercenaries, the disadvantages of which he emphasized. You can only rely on a force of citizens and volunteers. It is fatal to neglect one's armament and to give up the illusion that peace can be maintained through alliances, negotiations and payments instead of securing one's own clout. The belief that an enemy invasion can be stopped with fortresses is also completely wrong.

Patricius emphasized the crucial role of the infantry, which is usually crucial. Only in three battles - including the Battle of Ravenna 1512 - did the use of artillery lead to the decision. In general, Patricius's military science statements are characterized by an underestimation of the artillery and the Arquebus n. Therefore, his Paralleli militari were outdated from a technical point of view as soon as they appeared. After all, he recognized the value of guns in naval battles and sieges.

=== Poetry theory ===
==== The determination of the object ====
With his poetry theory, Patricius distanced himself from traditional guidelines, both from ancient definitions and from the approaches developed in the Renaissance. Above all, he opposed Aristotle's poetics. His protest was directed against all conventional determinations of the nature and meaning of poetry, which impose formal or content-related limits on poetic work and thereby limit the poetic design possibilities. First and foremost, he opposed the ancient thesis, taken up by the influential contemporary Aristotle commentator Lodovico Castelvetro, that the task of the poet was to imitate natural or historical facts. Castelvetro claimed that poetry takes all of its light from history. He believed that poetry needed credibility and should therefore, at least in the main story, only represent relationships and events that were in harmony with natural processes and that could be imagined as historical facts. Patricius contrasted this with his concept of universal poetry, the subject matter of which encompasses the divine as well as the human and the natural. Any material can be the subject of poetic design if it is treated poetically. As a formal definition, he only accepted the verse form. The verse belongs to the essence of poetry and distinguishes it from prose. The Aristotelian definition of poetry by its alleged character as imitation is unusable, since Aristotle himself uses the term "imitation" in different meanings.

==== The peculiarity and function of poetry ====
A central concept of Patricius's poetics is the 'mirabile', the 'wonderful', that is, what arouses astonishment or admiration in the reader because it stands out from the mass of ordinary, uniform and self-evident phenomena. According to the understanding of the humanist philosopher, the mirabile is the defining characteristic of poetry, through which it is defined in terms of content. When determining the function of this wonderful thing, there is an analogy between the peculiarity and position of man in the cosmos and the specific nature and task of poetry in culture. According to an anthropological premise common in the Renaissance, man stands as a mediating and connecting entity between the world of the spiritual and that of the physical. This enables him to bring the spiritual into the physical world and also depict the physical in the spiritual. It transfers from one area to another, transforming and transfiguring. For Patricius, this role of man in creation corresponds to the task of poetry in the field of "art" (arte), human products: Poetry mediates in an analogous way between the purely spiritual and the material. The analogy thus established also extends to the factor that makes the mediating entity what it is. The peculiarity of man, which determines his nature and from which his special position results, is the spirit (mente) or reason. What the spirit is in relation to man is, according to Patricius's explicit statement, the mirable in poetry. Just as reason is the universal form of man, which constitutes him as man, so the wonderful is the specific quality that makes every poem such. This also results in an analogy in the order of rank of those who work: Just as the exercise of reason places man above all other animated beings, so the linguistic design of the mirabile elevates the poet above all others who write texts of any kind .

The determining factor is the mirable form principle of what it designs. His function is thus comparable to that of the soul in man. Just as the soul penetrates and shapes all parts of the body, the mirabile exerts its shaping power on the whole of a seal. We can only speak of poetry where the effective presence of the wonderful is palpable and gives the entire product the appropriate quality. Thus three aspects determine the poetic: firstly, the influence of its specific principle of form, secondly, the dignity that corresponds to the high rank of this creative principle, and thirdly, the universal presence of the principle of form in what it has shaped. This results in the need for the verse form, since according to Patricius's judgment it is the only linguistic form that is appropriate to the content quality made possible by the mirabile.

One of the common connotations of the miraculous in the Renaissance is that it not only arouses astonishment and admiration, but also enables knowledge by leading into the world of the new and amazing. According to Patricius's teaching in the field of poetry, this refers to a special being, an independent reality, which the poet created through his shaping (formazione). The peculiarity of the mirabile in poetry for the humanist thinker is that it shows itself in a successful mixture (mescolanza) of the familiar and the unfamiliar. A poet may and should exceed the limits of what is allowed by the theoreticians, he should consciously disregard norms such as imitation of the natural and conformity with normal life experience and include the unusual and improbable. Since he has to present to the public both familiar and credible effects as well as new and incredible things, he has to mix opposites, and his mastery of this task shows his art. The poetic act takes place on the border of being and not being, of possible and real, of believable and unbelievable, but does not let this border exist, but gives the unbelievable the "face" of the believable and vice versa. The success of this mixing creates the mirabile in the product, which turns it into poetry.

The universal conception of Patricius's poetics excludes narrowing the poetic productivity by one-sided standards. A preference for certain role models such as Homer or trends such as Petrarcism is therefore not an option.

In Patricius's poetry, particular emphasis is placed on the requirement that the aim of poetry should not be to create affects, not to enchant and deceive, but to redirect the soul of the listener or reader through the insight conveyed to him. The mixture of the familiar and the unfamiliar, the understood and the misunderstood should create a tension in the reader that drives him to do soto want to understand what is not understood. It should initiate a learning process. The role of the mirabile as the central principle of the action of poetry is therefore not an expression of a subjectivist aesthetic of Patricius or an orientation towards the irrational; rather, it results from the didactic concern of poetry to bring about a transition from ignorance to knowledge. This occurs through an impetus for reflection.

An important goal of Patricius's poetics is the defense of Theory of inspiration, according to which significant poets share in a Transcendent reality and their productivity is the fruit of divine inspiration. The inspiration is shown in the furore poetico, the ecstatic enthusiasm for poetic production that can only be explained as a result of the influence of a deity. Patricius's remarks are a response to Aristotelian Lodovico Castelvetro's fundamental criticism of enthusiasm. In Castelvetro's opinion, the furore poetico only exists in a naive popular belief, which is fueled by the poet's addiction to self-validation and self-mystification. Accordingly, it is a list of poets who claim to be inspired to gain prestige and hearing. In contrast, Patricius's plea stands for the authenticity of the emotion. It tries to invalidate the physiological reasoning of Aristotelians, according to which the "obsession" of what is seized by the "furore" can be interpreted as a symptom of a temperament. However, according to Patriciuss, the furore was only at work with authors of past ages, not in the Petrarchist poetry of his own time. The successful contemporary poems are not divinely inspired, but products of talent and artistry.

=== Love theory ===
Patricius also appeared in the field of love theory as an innovator, he announced a "new philosophy of love". However, the core components of his concept were already known, were based on ancient ideas or had already been presented by other humanists. The teaching presented in Plato's dialogues Symposium and Phaidros served as the starting point. Like Plato, Patricius saw love as an inclination to the divine beauty, which gives the soul the "wings" with which it can rise to its transcendent home. It was a performance familiar to the educated audience. Two other theses of the humanist were less conventional: he claimed that love does not belong to the nature of man, but comes from outside as Accidents, and that all kinds of love are from love itself itself, the philautia. However, these ideas were not new either. They had been brought forward by Mario Equicola in the early 16th century, and Aristotle had already attributed love for others to self-love.

At the time, however, this was a subversive concept, because the appreciation of love for oneself was unusual and offensive to large groups. It was particularly provocative that the Christian love of neighbor and love of God of the believer were also interpreted as variations of self-love. In the Platonic and Stoic traditions, as well as in the Christian tradition, self-love was considered suspect. The suspicion of a justification of selfishness or an Epicurean way of thinking was obvious. However, Patricius's thesis was not meant that way because he did not take self-love in the sense of selfish preference. Rather, he also referred to an aspect that compensates for self-reference: the enviousness of good that was already thematized by Plato. According to Platonic understanding, this inevitably causes the good altruistic to be communicated. A real innovation was the insertion of sexuality into the old concept of the ascent of the lover driven by Eros. According to the conventional Platonic view, Patricius said that human love begins with the sight of physical beauty and then rises to the spiritual beauty of the loved one, and so one gradually moves towards divine love. In contrast to tradition, however, the humanist theorist assumed that the erotic then descended again over several levels to sensual love until he reached the bottom and last level, and that was the physical union. Patricius thus shifted the end point of the erotic movement from transcendence to sexuality.

Following the Platonic tradition, Patricius also assigned a metaphysical and cosmological dimension to love. He saw in it not only a phenomenon of the human world, but a real principle in the cosmos, which he believed to be inspired. On the cosmic level, according to his philosophy of love, the function of holding together the individual components of the world as a connecting force and ensuring the continuity of being exists. Accordingly, it is the foundation of the existence of all things. Their universal presence permeates all life in the universe. Here too, it is originally self-love, because God created creation out of love for himself, and he loves things because they are aspects of himself. So he loves himself in them. Accordingly, as an image of God, man also loves himself first. This is the prerequisite for his love for others and especially for God. According to this understanding, every human or divine love for others is a self-communication, which presupposes that the lover affirms his own being and his self-identity. Self-love understood in this way is a manifestation of unity as a self-reference. Then when the love of the individual turns to the outside world, his self-preservation efforts are extended there. In addition, self-love is the source and foundation of all human feelings, thoughts and actions, including religious ones. The background to this concept is Patricius's conviction that the being of all being is characterized by the basic structure of the self-relationship. In this context, he coined the Latin expression persentiscentia ("self-awareness"), with which he described the experience of staying with one another, the awareness of permanent self-identity.

== Reception ==
=== Early modern times ===
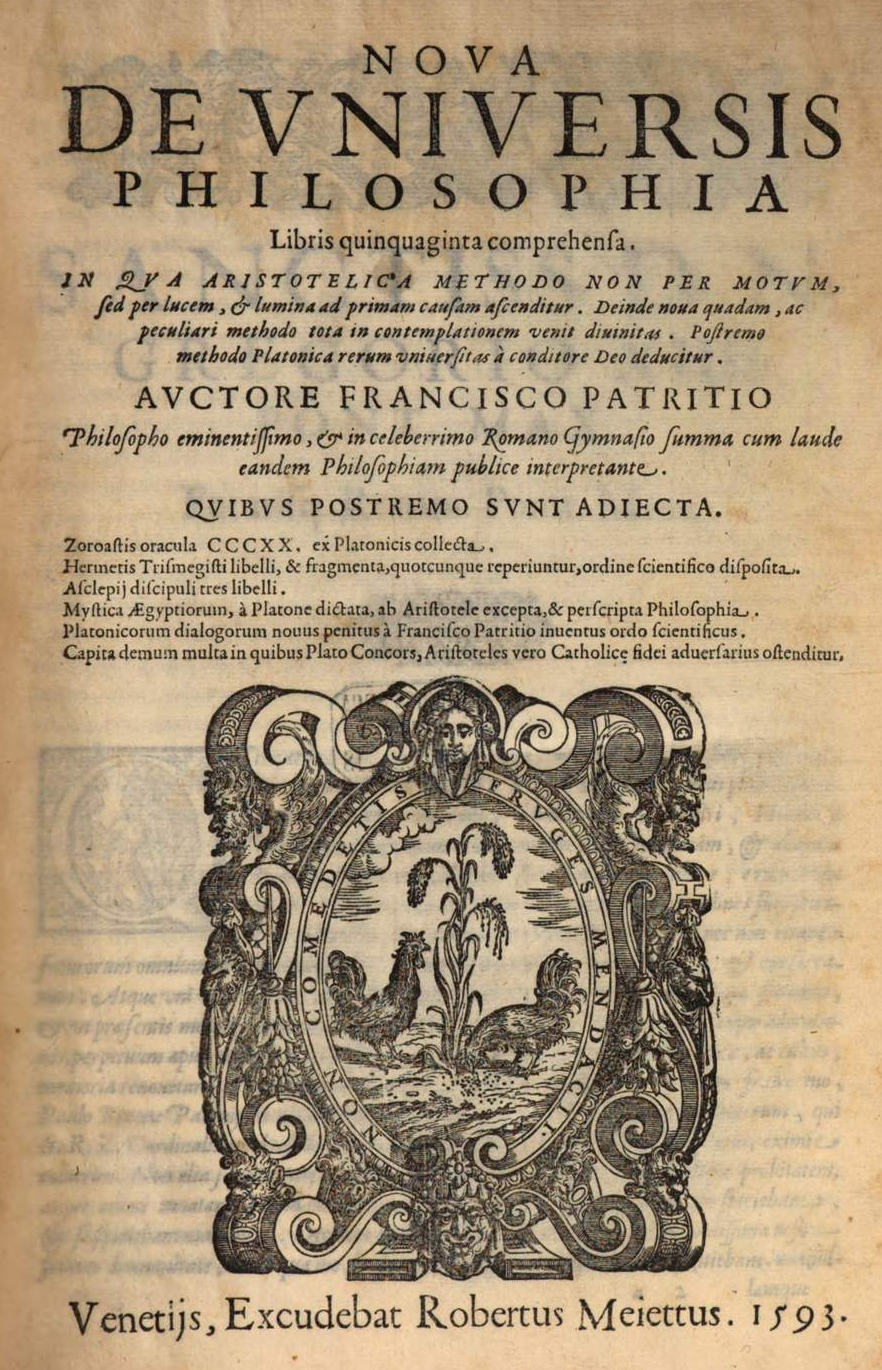
The title page of the edition of the Nova de universis philosophia printed in Venice, supposedly in 1593, but only after the church ban of 1594.

After a long period of unsuccess, Patricius was finally able to gain respect in science, as the establishment of two chairs at important universities shows for him. His proposal to replace the Aristotelian program with a Platonic one in church educational institutions was not heard by Pope Clement VIII. The demise of the two chairs for Platonic philosophy tailored to him after his departure shows that his philosophy was considered out of date. The Roman chair was closed in 1600.

Patricius's theory of nature and criticism of Aristotle were strongly received in the late 16th and 17th centuries, although his main work was on the index of forbidden books, from which it was only removed in 1900. Even in Italy, the ban on the Nova de universis philosophia could initially not be enforced across the board: a new edition with the wrong date 1593 appeared in Venice, pretending that it had already been printed before the ban in 1594. This issue was distributed in Protestant Northern and Central Europe, where at that time a Catholic condemnation acted as an advertisement.

==== Positive reception ====
Patricius's philosophy of nature was well received by anti-Aristotelian thinkers who liked to use his arguments. An early recipient was the English natural philosopher Nicholas Hill, who took up the ideas of the Italian humanist in his "Philosophia Epicurea" printed in 1601, without naming him. Pierre Gassendi (1592–1655), who wrote a book against Aristotelianism wanted to write, gave up his project when he discovered the Nova de universis philosophia. Gassendi's concept of space clearly shows the influence of this work. Tommaso Campanella (1568–1639) positively received Patricius's theory of principles, Johann Amos Comenius (1592–1670) linked to his light metaphysics. Pierre Bayle (1647–1706) appreciated the metaphysics and natural science of the Venetian philosopher. He considered him an important thinker and said that the Nova de universis philosophia reveals the very admirable depth of mind of its author. Patricius's main work was also appreciated in the 17th century by the Cambridge Platonists n, especially by Henry More, who wrote the further developed the space concept presented there.

The dialogues about history and its research met with a considerable response. A Latin translation, De legendae scribendaeque historiae ratione dialogi decem, appeared in Basel in 1570, one of English abstract, Thomas Blundeville, `` The true order and method of wryting and reading hystories, 1574 in London. Patricius's concept met with enthusiastic approval from the Italian emigrant living in England, Jacopo Aconcio, a friend of Blundeville. It was taken up by Paolo Beni and Tommaso Campanella in the early 17th century.

==== Critical voices ====
Defenders of Aristotelism like Teodoro Angelucci and Jacopo Mazzoni were among the contemporary opponents of the Venetian Platonist, but also Giordano Bruno, who, like Patricius, fought Aristotelism, but did not believe in the Discussiones peripateticae. He described this work as pedant manure and regretted that the author had stained so much paper with his effusions. Later, however, Bruno seems to have passed a milder judgment. He is said to have said that Patricius was an incredulous philosopher and still succeeded as the Pope's favorite in Rome. Judging very disparagingly Francis Bacon, a younger contemporary. He found that Patricius had recently made nonsensical and fantastic claims in a state of contempt.

Sharp criticism came from the astronomical side. Tycho Brahe complained in a letter to Johannes Kepler in December 1599 that his position in the Nova de universis philosophia was misrepresented. This is true; Patricius had criticized Brahe's view on the basis of an incorrect second-hand presentation, since his treatise on Comet of 1577 was not accessible to him. Kepler then violently attacked Patricius in his 1600/1601 Apologia pro Tychone contra Ursum, a defense document for Tycho. He accused him of not distinguishing between real and apparent movements. Kepler's criticism, however, was based on the fact that he had misunderstood Patricius's model.

Gottfried Wilhelm Leibniz also had an unfavorable opinion. He described Patricius as a man of considerable talent, but who had spoiled his mind by reading the writings of "pseudoplatonists". By this Leibniz meant above all the ancient Neoplatonists. The Venetian recognized defects in geometry, but was unable to fix them.

==== The philosopher as a dialogue figure ====
The writer Annibale Romei had Patricius appear as a dialogue figure in his Discorsi, which was completed in 1586. There the Venetian philosopher presents his cosmology and beauty theory and takes part in the dispute over honor, duel, nobility and wealth. On the seventh and last day of the dialogues, he discussed with the experienced courtier Giulio Cesare Brancaccio whether philosophy or military service should be given priority.

=== Modern research literature ===
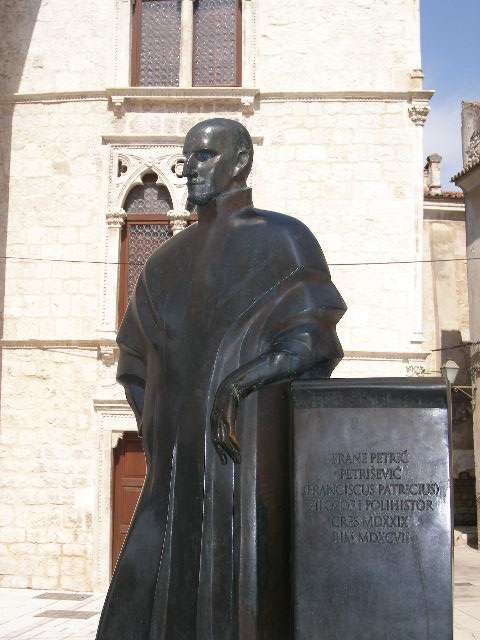
Statue Patricius in Cres, Croatia

In the very rich modern research literature, Patricius is often recognized as an independent, innovative thinker, and his performance is considered important. This refers to the philosophical and literary theoretical works, to the historical theory and philological competence of the humanist, but not to his mathematical ideas. Hanna-Barbara Gerl describes him as an ingenious thinker of genuinely Renaissance philosophy who has the unconditional will to represent the method and the uniform explanatory ground for everything real. After the judgment of Thomas Leinkauf he was the most important Platoniker of the early modern period after Marsilio Ficino. However, it is also pointed out that his strength lay in criticizing the conventional, not in developing viable alternatives. In this sense, Benedetto Croce already expressed itself in 1903.

The natural philosophy model, above all the theory of space, receives attention and recognition. Thus, Ernst Cassirer in 1911 ruled that the Nova de universis philosophia, along with Telesio's main work De rerum natura, was the most important attempt at a uniform and independent explanation of nature in philosophy at the time. Paul Oskar Kristeller expressed a widespread opinion when he 1964 stated that there were good reasons to count Patricius among the natural philosophers who "paved the way for the new science and philosophy of the 17th century and modernity". As a thinker of a transition period, he tried to develop a systematic explanation of the physical universe in a new and original way. This is a mixture of science and speculation. His work represents a great attempt at system formation, but at the same time reveals a number of gaps and discrepancies.

The poetry theory of the humanist is regarded as an exceptional achievement, whose special position in the extensive literature of Cinquecento on this subject is emphasized. Patricius's struggle against Aristotelian poetics is seen as an innovative, albeit little after-effect, impulse that could hardly have affected Aristotelian dominance in this area in the 17th and 18th centuries. George Saintsbury found in 1902 that as a literary critic Patricius was two centuries ahead of his time. Rainer Stillers highlighted the highly developed methodological awareness in 1988, which is reflected in Patricius's careful consideration of tradition and his methodical progression from facts to theory show. On the other hand, Bernard Weinberg, who raised the accusation of a lack of consistency in 1961, and the antiaristoteli rejected the argumentation as not valid.

History theory is also highly valued. For example, Franz Lamprecht wrote in 1950 that Patricius was in the middle of an empty formalism, a frozen mindset "preserves the pure basic idea of the humanistic world view". He was a main representative of the current, which "was looking for a way to a more comprehensive and scientifically based conception of history". In his concept, history has become science in the modern sense for the first time. Similar comments were made on Patricius's pioneering role in the establishment of scientific history research u. a. Giorgio Spini (1948), Rüdiger Landfester (1972) and Thomas Sören Hoffmann ( 2007). Thomas Leinkauf (2017) said that Patricius had probably the most interesting and bold concept of history in the 16th Century.

The diligence of the humanistic scholar, his thorough knowledge of the history of philosophy and his precise textual work are emphasized. However, criticism is given to the bias, which is sometimes regarded as fanatical, in his polemical efforts to refute and discredit Aristotle in all areas.

There is general agreement that Patricius's attempt to re-establish geometry was unsuccessful. From a mathematical-historical point of view, it is found that he actually found a weakness in Euclid Elements, but that he was unable to fix it with his own approach. His design of an alternative to Euclidean geometry is already a step backwards seen in ancient times. Even though some of the relevant assumptions were correct, his astronomical view of the world has also proved unsuitable. The reason for this failure is given in research as his purely philosophical approach to scientific problems.

Patricius's diverse impulses are answered differently to the question of the classification of intellectual history. Some researchers such as Cesare Vasoli and Lina Bolzoni locate his ideas in the middle of the Cinquecento world of ideas. Others, especially Giorgio Spini, Stephan Otto and Danilo Aguzzi Barbagli, emphasize the revolutionary potential of his theses, which point beyond the Renaissance into the future. You see him as an exponent of an epochal upheaval, a forerunner of the rationalistic discourse that subsequently strengthened and aimed at scientific precision. Carolin Hennig locates him in a zone of upheaval between Renaissance and Baroque and registers "proto-baroque tendencies". Because of his philosophical orientation, even his affiliation with Renaissance humanism is not unanimously accepted.

== Gallery ==
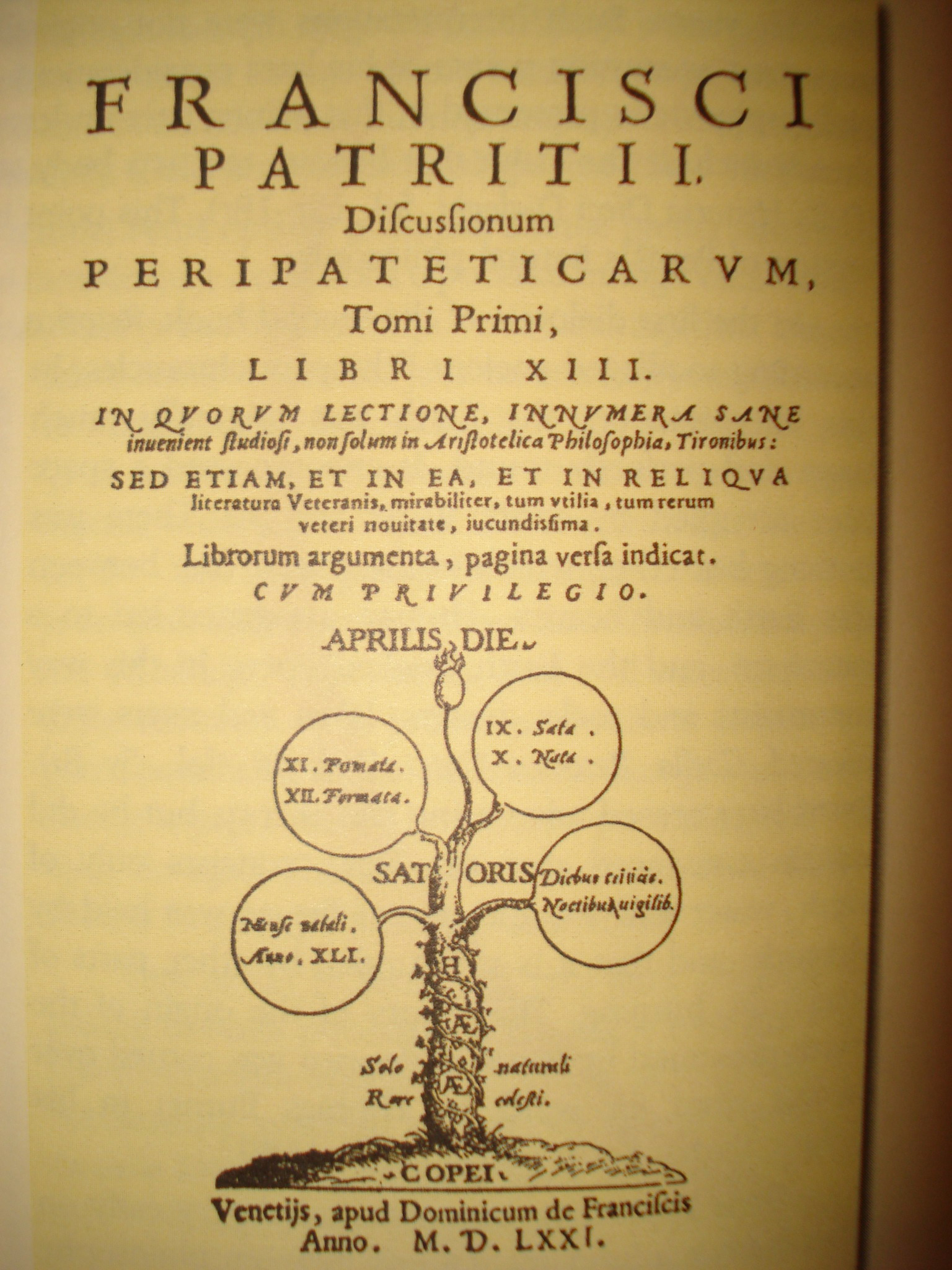
"Peripatetical Discussion" (Latin: "Discussionum peripateticarum"), first volume - title page; published in Venice in 1571

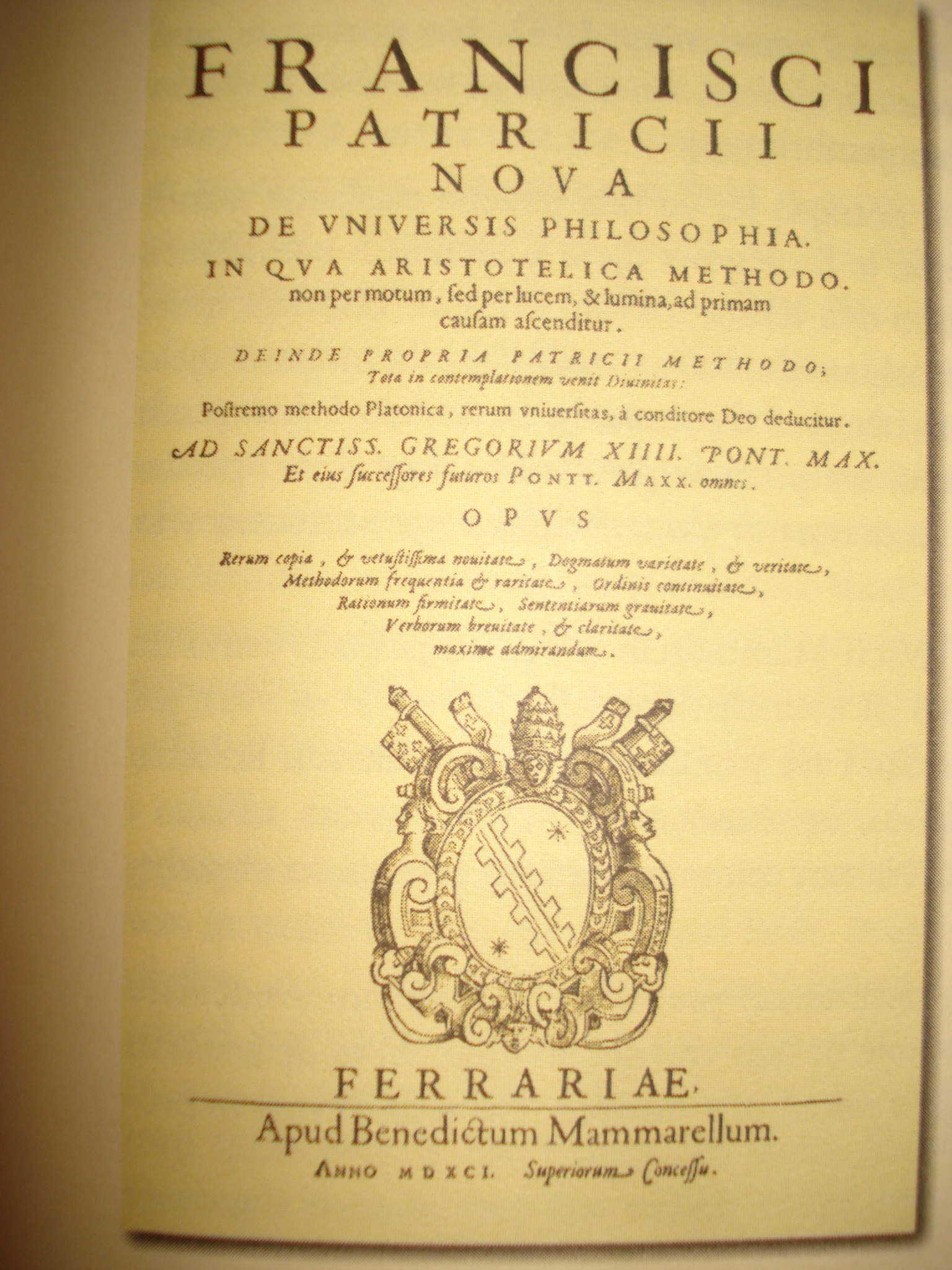
"The New Universal Philosophy" (Latin: "Nova de universis philosophia") - title page; published in Ferrara in 1591

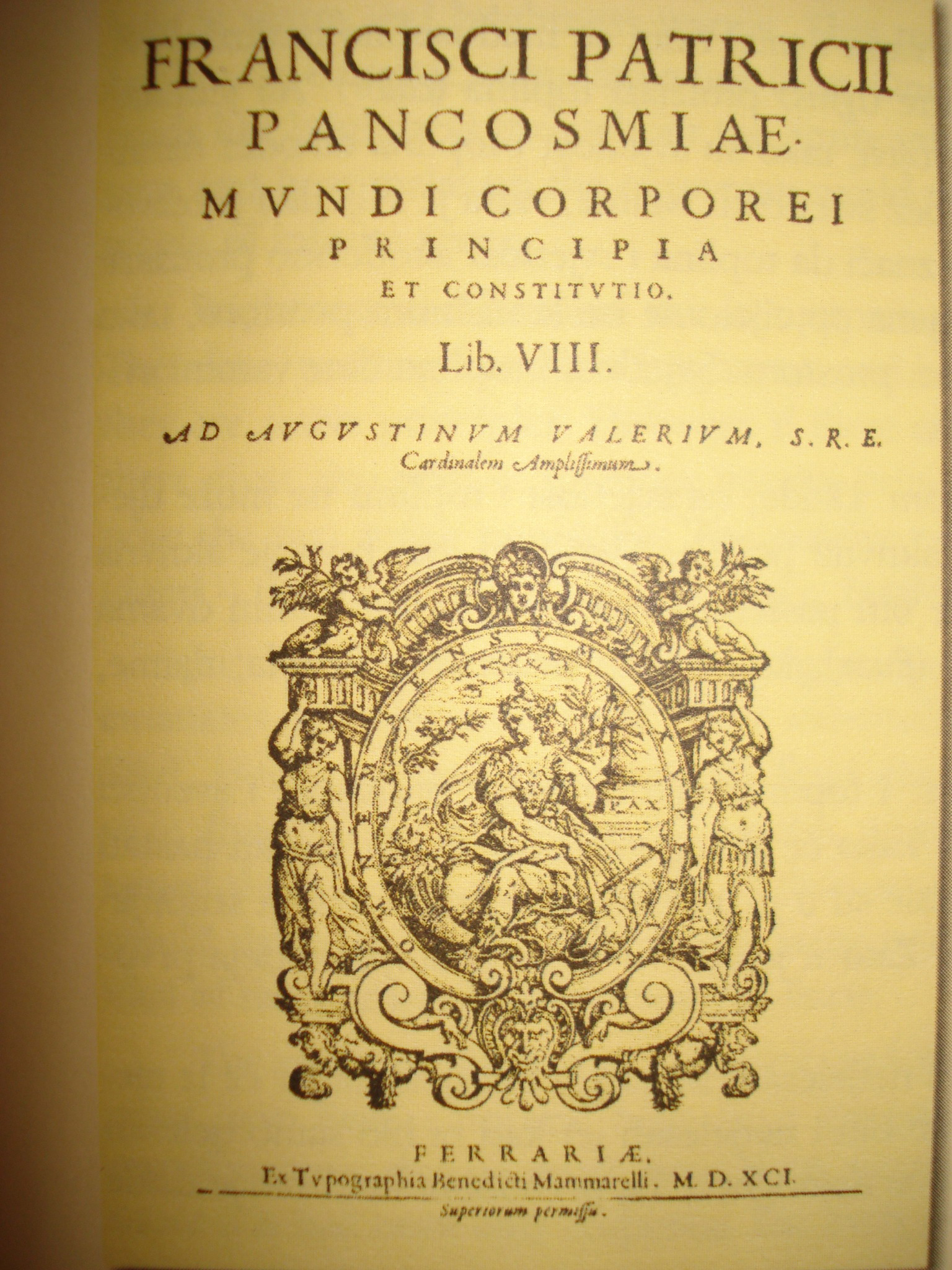
"The Beginnings and Establishment of the Universal Physical World" (Latin: "Pancosmiae mundi corporei principia et constitutio"), eighth volume – title page; Ferrara, 1591

== Editions and translations ==
Modern editions and translations

- Danilo Aguzzi Barbagli (ed.): Francesco Patricius da Cherso: Della poetica. 3 volumes. Istituto Nazionale di Studi sul Rinascimento, Florence 1969-1971 (also contains the Discorso della diversità de 'furori poetici in the third volume)
- Danilo Aguzzi Barbagli (ed.): Francesco Patricius da Cherso: Lettere ed opuscoli inediti.Istituto Nazionale di Studi sul Rinascimento, Florence 1975 (includes the writings on water management and the dialogue Il Delfino overo Del bacio. Critical review: Lina Bolzoni: A proposito di una recente edizione di inediti patriziani. In: Rinascimento. Volume 16, 1976, pp. 133–156)
- Lina Bolzoni (ed.): La poesia e le "imagini de 'sognanti" (Una risposta inedita del Patricius al Cremonini). In: Rinascimento. Volume 19, 1979, pp. 171–188 (critical edition of a poetic theory statement by Patricius)
- Lina Bolzoni (ed.): Il "Badoaro" di Francesco Patricius e l'Accademia Veneziana della Fama. In: Giornale storico della letteratura italiana. Volume 18, 1981, pp. 71–101 ( Edition with detailed introduction)
- Silvano Cavazza (ed.): Una lettera inedita di Francesco Patricius da Cherso. In: Centro di Ricerche Storiche - Rovigno: Atti. Volume 9, 1978/1979, pp. 377–396 (Edition a letter from Patricius to the Congregation for the Index with detailed introduction and commentary from the editor)
- Antonio Donato (translator): Italian Renaissance Utopias. Doni, Patricius, and Zuccolo. Palgrave Macmillan, Cham 2019, ISBN 978-3-030-03610-2, pp. 61–120 (English translation of La città felice)
- Alessandra Fiocca: Francesco Patricius e la questione del Reno nella seconda metà del Cinquecento: tre lettere inedite. In: Patriciusa Castelli (ed.): Francesco Patricius, filosofo platonico nel crepuscolo del Rinascimento. Olschki, Florence 2002, ISBN 88-222-5156-3, pp. 253–285 (edition of three letters from Patricius from 1580 and 1581 to the Duke of Ferrara)
- Francesco Fiorentino: Bernardino Telesio ossia studi storici su l'idea della natura nel Risorgimento italiano. Volume 2. Successori Le Monnier, Florenz 1874, pp. 375–391 (edition from Patricius's letter to Telesio)
- Sylvie Laurens Aubry (translator): Francesco Patricius: Du baiser. Les Belles Lettres, Paris 2002, ISBN 2-251-46020-9 (French translation)
- John Charles Nelson (ed.): Francesco Patricius: L'amorosa filosofia. Felice Le Monnier, Florence 1963
- Sandra Plastina (ed.): Tommaso Campanella: La Città del Sole. Francesco Patricius: La città felice. Marietti, Genoa 1996, ISBN 88-211-6275-3
- Anna Laura Puliafito Bleuel (ed.): Francesco Patricius da Cherso: Nova de universis philosophia. Materiali per un'edizione emendata. Olschki, Florence 1993, ISBN 88-222-4136-3 (critical edition of Patricius's texts that were created as part of the planned revision of the Nova de universis philosophia)
- Frederick Purnell (ed.): An Addition to Francesco Patricius's Correspondence. In: Rinascimento. Volume 18, 1978, pp. 135–149 (edition of a letter from 1590)
- Thaddä Anselm Rixner, Thaddä Siber (translator): Life and Doctrine of Famous Physicists. Book 4: Franciscus Patritius. Seidel, Sulzbach 1823 ( Translation of excerpts from the Nova de universis philosophia, online)
- Giovanni Rosini (ed.): Parere di Francesco Patricius in difesa di Lodovico Ariosto. In: Giovanni Rosini (ed.): Opere di Torquato Tasso. Volume 10. Capurro, Pisa 1824, p. 159-176
- Hélène Védrine (ed.): Patricius: De spacio physico et mathematico. Vrin, Paris 1996, ISBN 2-7116-1264-3 (French translation with introduction)

Reprint of early modern issues

- Vladimir Filipović (ed.): Frane Petrić: Deset dijaloga o povijesti. Čakavski Sabor, Pula 1980 (Della historia diece dialoghi, reprint of the Venice 1560 edition with Croatian translation)
- Zvonko Pandžić (ed.): Franciscus Patricius: Discussiones Peripateticae. Reprint of the four-volume edition Basel 1581 (= Sources and contributions to Croatian cultural history. Volume 9). Böhlau, Cologne u. a. 1999, ISBN 3-412-13697-2 (with introduction by the editor)
- Anna Laura Puliafito Bleuel (ed.): Francesco Patricius: Della retorica dieci dialoghi. Conte, Lecce 1994, ISBN 88-85979-04-1 (reprint of the Venice 1562 edition)

16th-century editions

- Di M. Francesco Patritio La città felice. Del medesimo Dialogo dell'honore Il Barignano. Del medesimo discorso della diversità de 'furori poetici. Lettura sopra il sonetto del Petrarca La gola e'l sonno e l'ociose piume. Giovanni Griffio, Venice 1553 (online)
- L'Eridano in nuovo verso heroico. Francesco de Rossi da Valenza, Ferrara 1557 (online)
- Le rime di messer Luca Contile, divise in tre parti, con discorsi et argomenti di M. Francesco Patritio et M. Antonio Borghesi. Francesco Sansovino, Venice 1560 (online)
- Della historia diece dialoghi. Andrea Arrivabene, Venice 1560 (online)
- Della retorica dieci dialoghi. Francesco Senese, Venice 1562 (online)
- Discussionum Peripateticarum tomi IV. Pietro Perna, Basel 1581 (online)
- La militia Romana di Polibio, di Tito Livio, e di Dionigi Alicarnaseo. Domenico Mamarelli, Ferrara 1583 (online)
- Apologia contra calumnias Theodori Angelutii eiusque novae sententiae quod metaphysica eadem sint quae physica eversio. Domenico Mamarelli, Ferrara 1584 (online)
- Della nuova Geometria di Franc. Patrici libri XV. Vittorio Baldini, Ferrara 1587 (online, online)
- Difesa di Francesco Patricius dalle cento accuse dategli dal Signor Iacopo Mazzoni. Vittorio Baldini, Ferrara 1587
- Risposta di Francesco Patricius a due opposizioni fattegli dal Signor Giacopo Mazzoni. Vittorio Baldini, Ferrara 1587
- Philosophiae de rerum natura libri II priores, alter de spacio physico, alter de spacio mathematico. Vittorio Baldini, Ferrara 1587 (online)
- Nova de universis philosophia. Benedetto Mammarelli, Ferrara 1591 (online)
- Paralleli militari. Luigi Zannetti, Rome 1594 (first part of the work; online)
- De paralleli militari. Party II. Guglielmo Facciotto, Rome 1595 (online)

== See also ==
- List of Catholic clergy scientists
- List of Croats

== Sources ==
- Ugo Baldini, Leen Spruit (ed.): Catholic Church and Modern Science. Documents from the Archives of the Roman Congregations of the Holy Office and the Index. Volume 1: Sixteenth-Century Documents. Volume 3. Libreria Editrice Vaticana, Rome 2009, ISBN 978-88-209-8288-1, Pp. 2197–2264 (the files of the Index Congregation's proceedings, including the expert reports as well as letters and statements from Patricius)
