= World Chronicle =

World Chronicle was a half-hour news and documentary television program broadcast internationally by the United Nations. The series began production in 1980, and ceased production in 2006, after 1006 episodes.

In 1986, World Chronicle, and other materials produced by United Nations Department of Public Information, were accused of anti-American bias by the Heritage Foundation based on research by the United States Government Accountability Office.
