= Thomas Leinkauf =

Thomas Leinkauf (born November 4, 1954, in Lüneburg) is a German philosopher and a professor at Westfälische Wilhelms-Universität Münster. His fields of interest are late antique, Renaissance and early modern philosophy, as well as Idealism.

== Background and career ==
In 1974, he graduated at the "humanistic" branch of Markgrafen-Gymnasium in Karlsruhe. From 1975 to 1984 he studied philosophy (with Werner Beierwaltes), art history, and history, at Albert-Ludwigs-Universität Freiburg and Ludwig-Maximilians-Universität München.

He obtained a Dr. phil. degree with a dissertation entitled Kunst und Reflexion. Untersuchungen zum Verhältnis Philipp Otto Runges zur philosophischen Tradition in 1982. Afterwards, from 1982 to 1985, he was a research associate at Freiburg university and then, from 1985 to 1991, at FU Berlin, where he also obtained his habilitation in 1991, with the thesis Mundus combinatus. Studien zur Struktur der barocken Naturphilosophie unId Universalwissenschaft am Beispiel Athanasius Kirchers SJ (1602–1680). From 1991 to 1996, he held a "Heisenberg-Professur" there. In addition to this, he was a visiting professor at Charles University in Prague in winter semester 1992/93 and the summer semester 1993. Since 1996, he is a professor for philosophy at Westfälische Wilhelms-Universität and director of the Leibniz-Forschungsstelle in Münster, a branch of the Göttingen Academy of Sciences and Humanities dedicated to editing the philosophical manuscripts of Gottfried Wilhelm Leibniz. From 2010 to 2012, he received an Opus magnum scholarship for the work on his two-volume work Philosophie des Humanismus und der Renaissance. Furthermore, he is the editor of a bilingual Italian-German edition of the works of Giordano Bruno.

== Select bibliography ==
- Kunst und Reflexion. Untersuchungen zum Verhältnis Philipp Otto Runges zur philosophischen Tradition, München (Fink) 1987.
- Schelling als Interpret der philosophischen Tradition. Zur Rezeption und Transformation von Platon, Plotin, Aristoteles und Kant, Münster (LIT-Verlag) 1998.
- Nicolaus Cusanus. Eine Einführung in sein Denken, Münster (Aschendorff) 2006.
- coeditor: Lichtgefüge - Das Licht im Zeitalter Rembrandts und Vermeers - Ein Handbuch der Forschungsgruppe Historische Lichtgefüge, 2011.
- Einheit, Natur, Geist: Beiträge zu metaphysischen Grundproblemen im Denken von Gottfried Wilhelm Leibniz, Berlin 2012 ISBN 978-3896269270.
- Grundriss Philosophie des Humanismus und der Renaissance (1350-1600), 2 vols., Hamburg 2017 ISBN 978-3787327928.
