= Aevum =

Concept in Scholastic philosophy

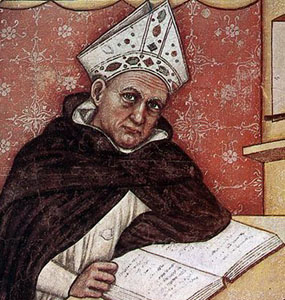
Saint Albert the Great

In scholastic philosophy, the aevum (also called aeviternity) is the temporal mode of existence experienced by angels and by the saints in heaven. In some ways, it is a state that logically lies between the eternity (timelessness) of God and the temporal experience of material beings. It is sometimes referred to as "improper eternity" or "participated eternity".

== Etymology ==
The word aevum is Latin, originally signifying "age", "aeon", or "everlasting time". It comes from the Greek term "αἰών" meaning eternity in the atemporal sense. Before the 13th century, the term aevum was used synonymously with eternity. The word aeviternity comes from the Medieval Latin neologism aeviternitas.

== History ==
Both Plato and Aristotle recognized two modes of duration: Time and Eternity. Plato said that the soul must be in time while Aristotle said that the soul must be in eternity. The Neoplatonist philosopher Simplicius of Cilicia, said there must be a third mode to describe celestial bodies and souls which are everlasting but still change.

In his exegesis of the Book of Genesis, Augustine of Hippo also recognized a mode of duration distinct from time and eternity. In Augustine's view, Heaven and earth, taken to mean formless matter, were created before time, and thus had existence in a participated eternity.

In the beginning of the 13th century, independently of direct influence from Simplicius, a doctrine of three measures of duration was developing at the University of Paris. These were known as eternity, sempiternity (or perpetuity), and time. In the Summa attributed to Alexander of Hales, this middle measure of duration was used to describe angels, souls, and celestial spheres, all of which have a beginning but no end.

The concept of the aevum, using the term as distinct from eternity, dates back at least to Albertus Magnus's first systematic study of time, De quattuor coaequaevis. In contrast to the concept of sempiternity, Albertus notes that even if something has no beginning and no end, its mode of duration would be distinct from the eternity of God. To Albertus, eternity is pure actuality while aevum is always actual, but only the actuality of some potency.

A description of aevum is found in the Summa theologica of Thomas Aquinas. Aquinas identifies the aevum as the measure of the existence of beings that "recede less from permanence of being, forasmuch as their being neither consists in change, nor is the subject of change; nevertheless they have change annexed to them either actually, or potentially". As examples, he cites the heavenly bodies (which, in medieval science, were considered changeless in their nature, though variable in their position.) and the angels, which "have an unchangeable being as regards their nature with changeableness as regards choice".

At the end of the 13th century, in De mensuris, Theodoric of Freiberg, further developed the philosophy of time. Theodoric distinguishes five measures of duration:

1. Superaetenitas - the measure of divine being; beyond eternity
2. Aeternitas - the measure of the being of divine intelligences "if such beings exist"
3. Aevum - the measure of angelic beings, which have a beginning, an everlasting existence, with no change in their substance but change in their accidents
4. Aeviternitas - the measure of celestial bodies, which have a beginning and are everlasting but inferior in perfection to angels
5. Time - the measure of beings with limited period of existence

In the 14th century, both Berthold of Moosburg and William of Ockham rejected the concept of aevum. Berthold held that there were only two measures of duration: eternity and time. William did not even believe eternity could be properly called a measure and held that time was the only measure of duration.

== Contemporary philosophy ==
Frank Sheed, in his book Theology and Sanity, said that the aevum is also the measure of existence for the saints in heaven:

"Aeviternity is the proper sphere of every created spirit, and therefore of the human soul... At death, [the body's] distracting relation to matter's time ceases to affect the soul, so that it can experience its proper aeviternity."

== See also ==
- Intermediate state (Christianity)
- Philosophy of space and time
- Physics (Aristotle)
- Proclus
- Temporal finitism
