= Berthold of Moosburg =

Neoplatonic philosopher and theologian (died after 1361)

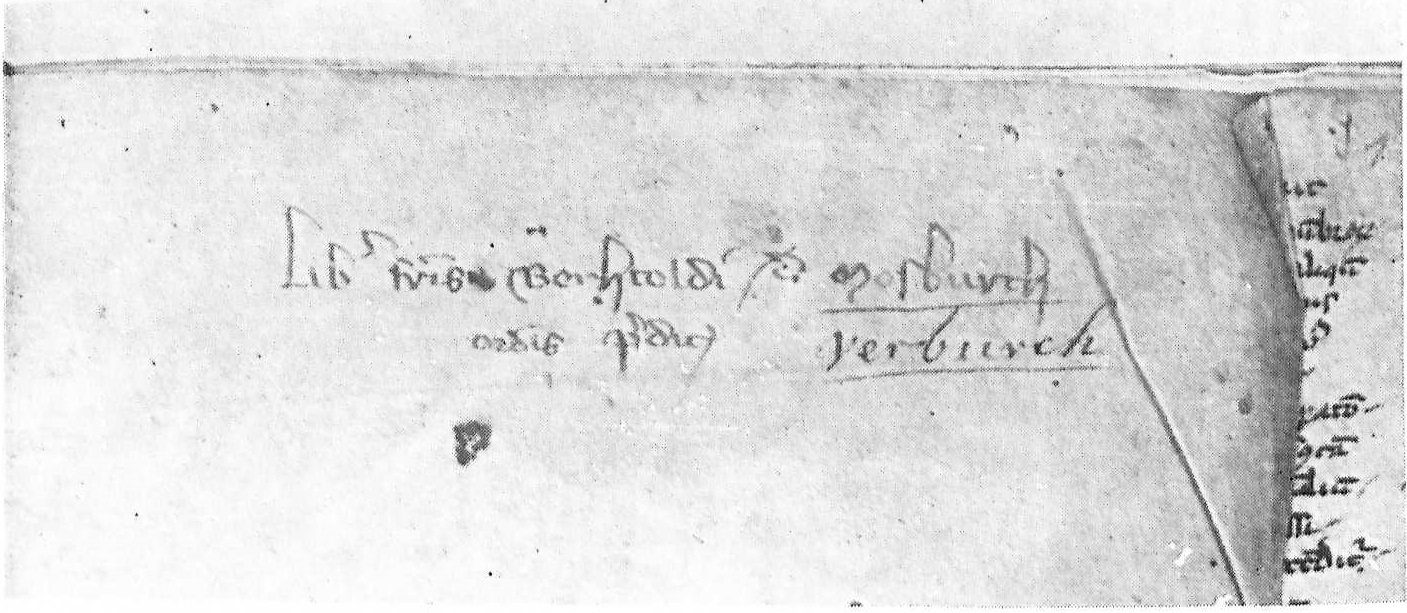
Berthold's handwritten mark of ownership in a copy of Albert Magnus's Treatise de Animalibus

Berthold of Moosburg (died after 1361) was a Dominican monk from the Teutonic Province. Not much is known about Berthold of Moosburg's youth. He was a member of the German Dominican order. The first recorded date on record for Berthold of Moosburg is 1316, when he was studying at Oxford University in England. At this time, Berthold would have been sixteen years old. In 1318, Berthold writes a 'marginal' commentary on De iride, a written work of Dietrich of Freiburg (sometimes called Theodoric of Freiburg). His active years spanned from 1316 to 1361, and these are the only years for which he can be traced in the historical record. Berthold, as a part of the Dominican order, was a theologian and neo-Platonist of the 14th century, teaching in Regensburg in 1327. In 1335, Berthold was called to head the Dominican order in Cologne, Germany, succeeding Eckhart. Also, in 1335 and again in 1343, in Cologne, he is listed as the 'executor' of estates.

As head of the Cologne Dominicans, Berthold represented the Dominican order and the nation of Bavaria in Nuremberg in 1348. While in Cologne, Germany, he would have read the work of his processors. This would have included written work from 'Albert the Great, Meister Eckhart, and Ulrich of Strasburg,' among others. In 1361, Berthold is listed once more as a representative and 'executor' of another unknown estate.

== Influences ==
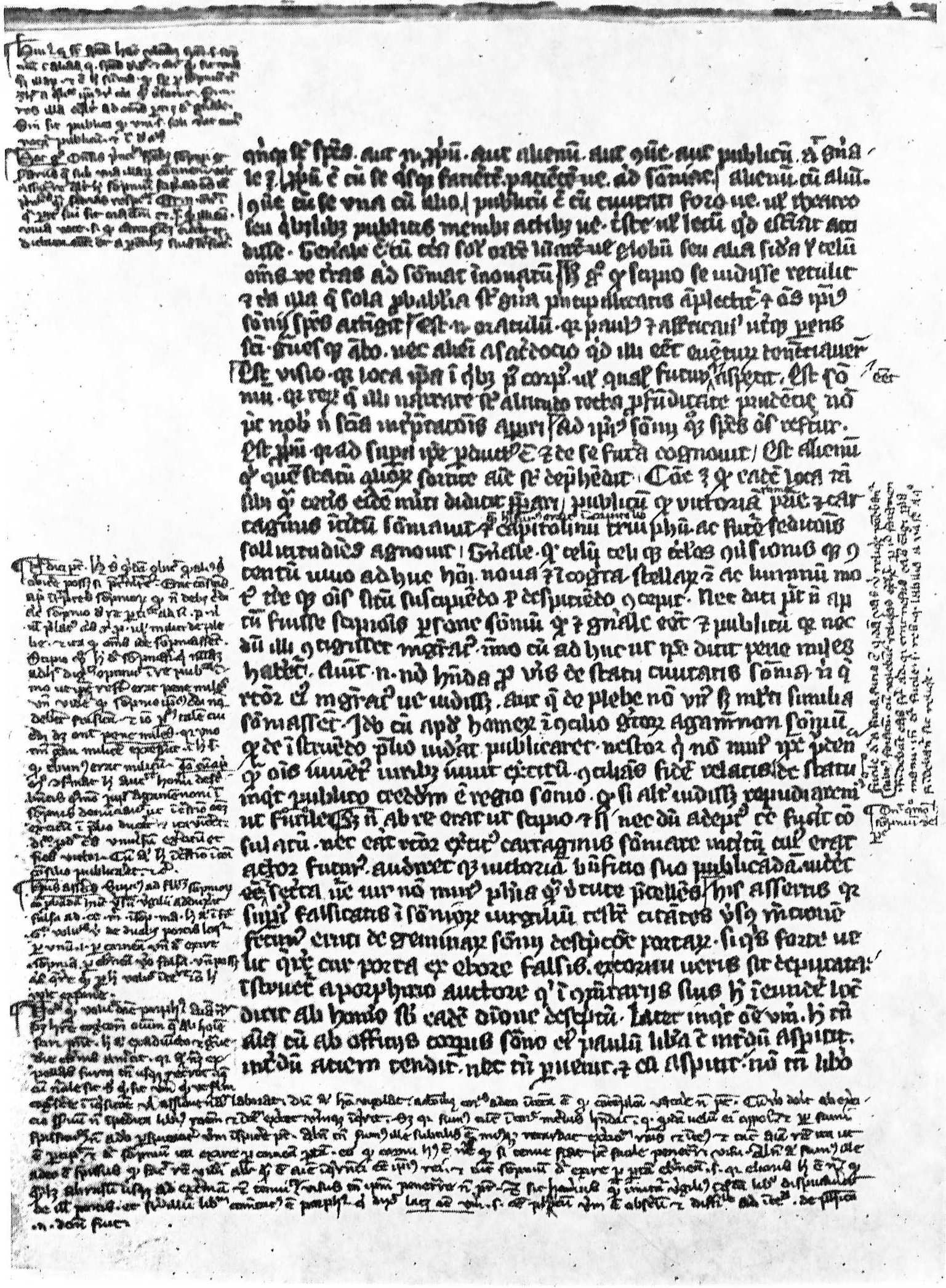
A page of a manuscript of Macrobuis' commentary on Cicero's Somnium Scipionis showing Berthold's own marginal glosses.

He is notable for his work on the neo-Platonist Proclus Lycaeus' Elements of Theology (Institutio Theologica) writing Expositio super Elementationem theologicam Procli, which was done based on the Latin translation of Proclus's work by another Dominican, Willem van Moerbeke. Expositio would become the only commentary written on Proclus's works to have come the medieval age. He attended Oxford, being dispatched there by his Dominican chapter for his studium generale. It is believed that during this time he would have discovered works that influenced him in his writings such as Thomas of York's Sapientiale, Macrobius' Comentarii in Somnium Scipionis, and most notably Proclus' Elementationem Theologicam, which Berthold cited ten times just in his glosses on Macrobius. Berthold's document, Expositio, was written after the condemnation of Eckhart, which led to a period of disunity and chaos within the Dominican order.

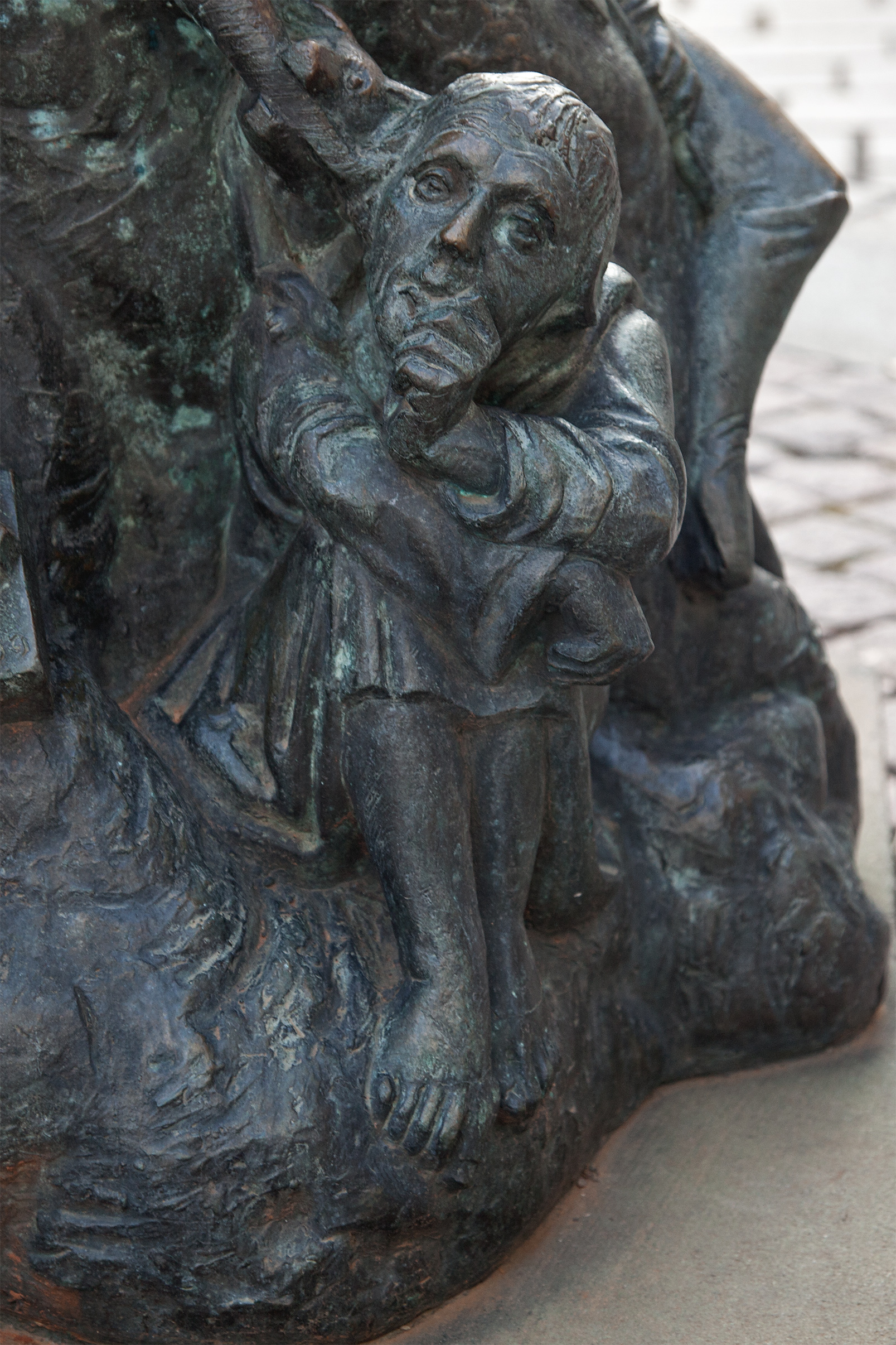
Bronze image of Dietrich of Freiberg, a major influence on Berthold of Moosburg, as shown on the Fortuna-Brunnen in Munich, Germany.

His Expositio super Elementationem theologicam Procli, written between 1340 and 1361, was a major statement of the importance for Platonism of Proclus. In the making of his Expositio, Berthold sought to create a comprehensive written work that served as a bridge between the Christian and non-Christian Platonic view of his day. As a result, Berthold's Expositio incorporates both 'Christian Platonic writings' and 'non- Christian Platonic writings.' Berthold takes wisdom from Euclid, and 'adopts' the 'axiomatic' writing structure and style. He had a strong respect for Euclid and Euclid's published works.

He opposed his Christian-Platonic synthesis to Aristotelian philosophy. His sources included Theodoric of Freiberg and Albertus Magnus. Following Proclus's model of two modes of duration, eternity and time, Berthold rejected the aevum, an intermediate mode of time held by Theodoric and Albertus. In Expositio Berthold makes 132 citations from 93 different chapters from Clavis. He uses these citations to reinterpret and to correct Proclus's doctrines to make it more inline with Christian and platonic belief. Further, in the making of Expositio, Berthold referenced and used several authors and written works on top of his use of Proclus' Elements of Theology in the making of Expositio. Some of the authors include but are not limited to 'Augustine of Hippo, Calcidius, Boethius, Apuleius, Macrobius, and Iohannes or John Scotus Eriugena.'

== Ideas and philosophy ==
Despite this rejection of Aristotelian ideas, Berthold borrows frequently from these predecessors. He often melds neo-Platonism and Christian theology in a synthesis sometimes called by contemporary scholars, eriugenism, a school of philosophy named for Johns Scotus Eriugena. Sometimes he would even attempt to build off the work of these Aristotelian thinkers, such as he did with Albertus Magnus's work, De Natura Origine Animae. Berthold states that “souls are poured in by being created and are created by being poured in” (creando infundi et infundendo creari). Stating as much creates a cyclical argument for the origin of souls and avoids the idea of a souls pre-existence in accordance with neo-platonic though. While this still puts Berthold in opposition to authors such as Proclus and Albertus, it presents his argument in such as way as not to be directly confrontational to them.

Berthold continues with his analysis of the soul, building of the analysis of Proclus by Dietrich of Freiburg who features frequently in his works as one who shares a similar way of thinking. In this he makes emphasis to further align with platonic theory by stating that the soul and body can never be truly joined as one "form". All of these arguments and those he makes on other topics serves to place learned members of the church such as Dionysius and Proclus in line with platonic philosophy. This is not to say that his work is meant solely to reframe the works of previous philosophers. Berthold often expanded on the philosophies of those whom he commented on such as he had done with Dietrich of Freiburg, wherein he extended his principles "both upward (from the intelligences to the gods), downward (to the incorruptible spiritual body)," when evaluating his commentaries on Proclus.

=== Providence and fate ===
Berthold was a pivotal figure in the discussion of providence in 13th and 14th century Germany. Regna duo duorum was a new concept created by Berthold of Moosburg and other theologians in the Dominican Order. Regna duo duorum focused on twofold providence, which separated natural providence and voluntary providence, and created two distinct realms.

Berthold also theorizes two hierarchal realms, the realm of providence, and the realm of fate. The realm of providence in Berthold's philosophy is the realm of God and gods. Berthold followed the standard Dominican theology at the time, believing that voluntary providence was the subject of dogmatic theology.

The realm of fate in Berthold's philosophy is the structure of structure of the physical world. Berthold also described natural providence as the realm of fate. He believed that many things were not subject to fate. Things close to God were exempt from fate, because of the control providence has over fate. In Berthold's Expositio, he defines natural providence as all natural occurrences on Earth and in the Heavens, and all other things in the natural world.

=== Forms ===
Berthold also believed in two forms of intellect, the primal intellect and the potential intellect. He believed that once the intellects aligned, it became impossible to speak of intellect any longer because intellect requires a difference between thought and the object of thought.

=== Dionysius and the Three Movements of the Soul ===
Throughout his works, Berthold reinstated the idea of the three movements of the soul, originally proposed by Dionysius the Areopagite and later studies by Proclus. According to Dionysius, the souls of both angels and humans perform a threefold movement that moves the soul to a higher understanding and closer to unification with God. For Berthold, the human soul was particularly important as the human soul is a part of the natural world and those of angels are not.

The first movement of the soul moves in a circular motion moving inward on itself and closer to God. This movement is marked by contemplation and withdrawal of the external world to focus on inner peace and unity. The second movement moves in a spiral and is defined by the idea of the soul moving from speculative reasoning towards that of intelligible understanding of the divine. The third and final movement of the soul moves in a straight line, reaching out towards God. According to Berthold, this third movement is what sums up the movements in what he called "unity" transcending the natural mind. Once all three movements of the soul are complete, the unification between God and the human soul become close enough that the human soul is deified. To Berthold, the individual deification of the soul is not substantive on its own, but the process itself is where the real substance lie.

== Expositio Super Elementationem Theologicam Procli ==
Berthold primary extant work, his Expositio Super Elementationem Theologicam Procli, often referred to more succinctly as his Expositio. It shows his adherence to Platonic ideas rather than the more common Aristotelian views of the day, demonstrated most clearly in the third introduction to his Expositio, praeambulum, wherein he presents a fictitious dialogue between Aristotelians and Platonist over their fundamental preconceptions upon which their logical arguments are built. Berthold's argument is not against philosophy's relation to theology, as one may expect given his disagreements on Aristotelian presuppositions, but rather against the Aristotelian preconceptions in metaphysics.

The book opens with three introductions before moving on to the propositum et commentum; the prologus, the expositio tituli, and the praeambulam. This pattern, that of a suppositum, propositum, and commentum, are consistent throughout Berthold of Moosburg's work. The prologus opens with a line spoken by St. Paul, whom Berthold refers to as the "summus divinalis sapientiae theologus Paulus loquens de mundanae philosophiae sapientibus" translated as "the highest theologian of the divinizing wisdom, regarding the sages of worldly philosophy."

The line comes from Romans 1:19-20 which say:

"Because that which may be known of God is manifest in them; for God hath shewed it unto them. For the invisible things of him from the creation of the world are clearly seen, being understood by the things that are made, even his eternal power and Godhead; so that they are without excuse."

Berthold proceeds to break apart the verse and analyse it piece by piece, going over any potential differences in grammar that could cause a change in meanings. Curiously, during his academic sermon, Berthold cites Hermes Trismegistus twice in his analysis, a pre-Platonic writer which he sourced from Albertus Magnus. Hermes Trismegistus holds a central role in the arguments made in the prologus and over half of the discussion on Romans 1:19 and 20 focuses much on interpreting it using the Hermetica.

Unlike the prologus and expositio tituli, the final prologue, the praeambulam libri, is not further exploration of main arguments and sources, but rather the first thirteen prepositions stated in the text. It established the central theme of Proclus's philosophy from which he builds his other prepositions, that of the One and the Good. This theory has much more to do with science and philosophy than theology, but Berthold presents and analogy between these things. This moves away from themes followed by Dietrich of Freiburg, who emphasised a separation between theology and "the divine science of the philosophers."

== Legacy and attributions ==
The first evidence of Berthold's influence can be found within the sermons of Johannes Tauler, who surprisingly endorsed the pagan philosopher Proclus in his sermons, citing Expositio as an important guide to understanding the relation between the Proclus's work and the soul.

Berthold's Expositio has notably have been influential on Nicholas of Cusa's works, and has been cited among a list of authoritative Neoplatonic authors in Cusa's Apologia doctae ignorantiae. The only other two direct citations of Berthold's Expositio coming from the 14th and 15th centuries come from an anonymous author from 14th-century Regensburg and another Dominican theologian, Franz Retz.

Nicholas of Cusa lists the author of Expositio as Johannes von Mossbach. Many names have been attributed to Berthold of Moosburg. Some of these different names are Berchtold, Berealdus, Bartholomeus, and Johannes von Mossbach. These names span a range of historical sources. One example of the different name(s) attributed to Berthold of Moosburg in the historical timeline appears more than fifty years later when Nicholas of Cusa gives credit to Moosburg for his written work Expositio, stating its 'importance.'

== Works ==
- Expositio super elementationem theologicam Procli 184-211. De animabus, edited by Loris Sturlese, Rome, Edizioni di storia e letteratura, 1974.
- Bertoldo di Moosburg, Tabula contentorum in Expositione super Elementationem theologicam Procli, edited by A. Beccarisi, Pisa, Scuola Normale Superiore, 2000.
- Expositio super Elementationem theologicam Procli, in Corpus philosophorum Teutonicorum medii aevi, vol. 6, edited by Loris Sturlese:
  - 6/1: Prologus. Propositiones 1-13, Meiner, Hamburg 1984. ISBN 3-7873-0599-8
  - 6/2: Propositiones 14-34, Meiner, Hamburg 1986. ISBN 3-7873-0673-0
  - 6/3: Propositiones 35-65, Meiner, Hamburg 2001. ISBN 3-7873-1560-8
  - 6/4: Propositiones 66-107, Meiner, Hamburg 2003. ISBN 3-7873-1655-8
  - 6/6: Propositiones 136–159, Meiner, Hamburg 2007
  - 6/7: Propositiones 160-183, Meiner, Hamburg 2003

== See also ==
- Neoplatonism
- Proclus
- Theodoric of Freiberg
