= Transmission of the Greek Classics =

Key factor in the development of intellectual life in Western Europe

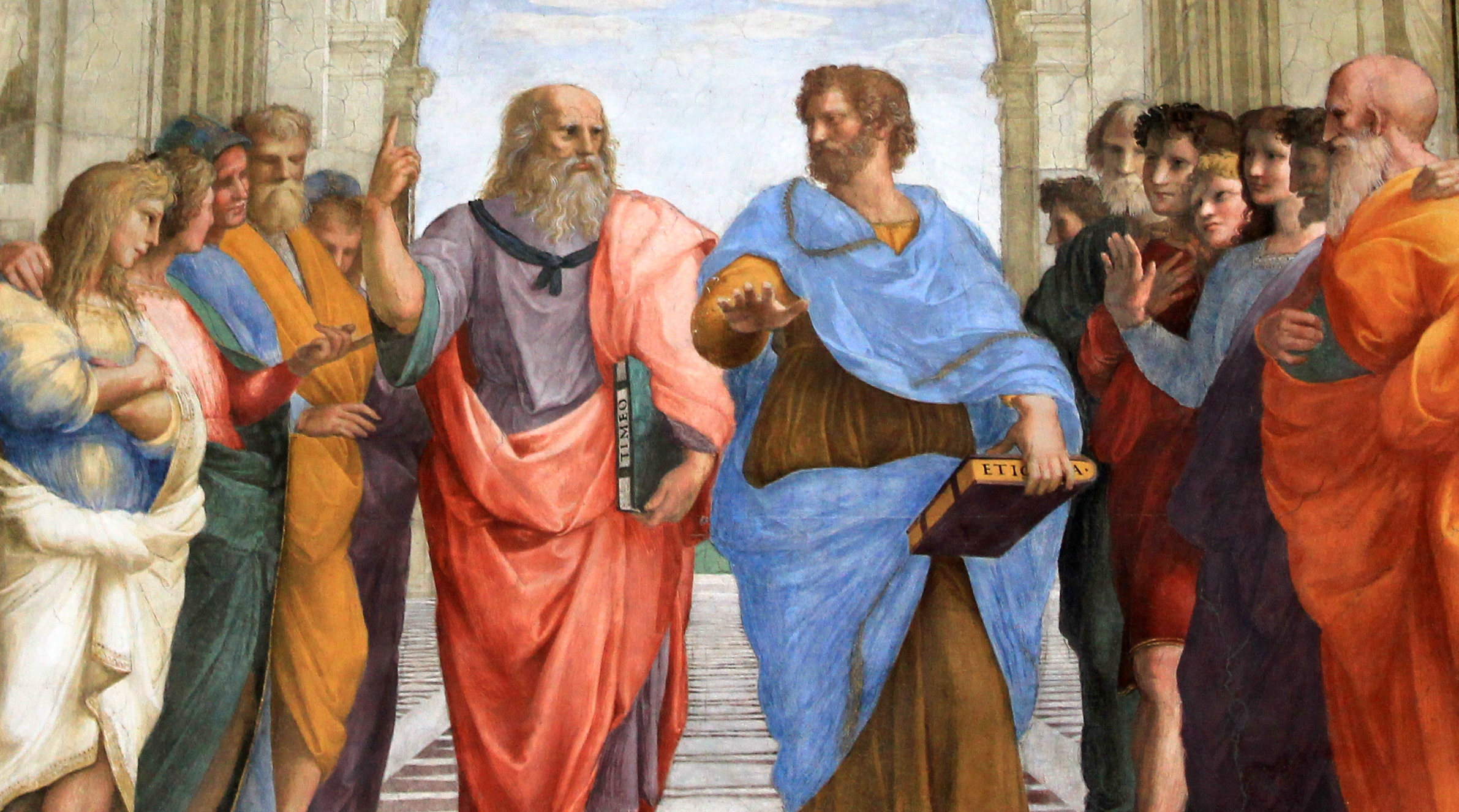
The ideas of Aristotle and Plato, shown in Raphael's The School of Athens, were partly lost to Western Europeans for centuries.

The transmission of the Greek Classics to Latin Western Europe during the Middle Ages was a key factor in the development of intellectual life in Western Europe. Interest in Greek texts and their availability was scarce in the Latin West during the Early Middle Ages, but as traffic to the East increased, so did Western scholarship.

Classical Greek philosophy consisted of various original works ranging from those from Ancient Greece (e.g. Aristotle) to those Greco-Roman scholars in the classical Roman Empire (e.g. Ptolemy). Though these works were originally written in Greek, for centuries the language of scholarship in the Mediterranean region, a number of them were translated into Syriac, Arabic, and Persian during the Middle Ages and the original Greek versions were often unknown in western Europe. With increasing Western presence in the East due to the Crusades, and the gradual collapse of the Byzantine Empire during the Late Middle Ages, multiple Byzantine Greek scholars fled to Western Europe, bringing with them a number of original Greek manuscripts, and providing impetus for Greek-language education in the West and further translation efforts of Greek scholarship into Latin.

The line between Greek scholarship and Arab scholarship in Western Europe was blurred during the Middle Ages and the Early Modern Period. Sometimes the concept of the transmission of Greek Classics is often used to refer to the collective knowledge that was obtained from the Arab and Byzantine Empires, regardless of where the knowledge actually originated. However, being once and even twice removed from the original Greek, these Arabic versions were later supplanted by improved, direct translations by Moerbeke and others in the 13th century and after.

== Direct reception of Greek texts ==
As knowledge of Greek declined in the West with the fall of the Western Roman Empire, so did knowledge of the Greek texts, some of which had remained without a Latin translation. The fragile nature of papyrus as a writing medium meant that older texts not copied onto expensive parchment would eventually crumble and be lost.

After the Fourth Crusade (1202–1204) and the Sack of Constantinople (1204), scholars such as William of Moerbeke gained access to the original Greek texts of scientists and philosophers, including Aristotle, Archimedes, Hero of Alexandria and Proclus, that had been preserved in the Byzantine (Eastern Roman) Empire, and translated them directly into Latin.

The final decline and collapse of the Byzantine empire in the fifteenth century heightened contact between its scholars and those of the west. Translation into Latin of the full range of Greek classics ensued, including the historians, poets, playwrights and non-Aristotelian philosophers. Manuel Chrysoloras (c. 1355–1415) translated portions of Homer and Plato. Guarino da Verona (1370–1460) translated Strabo and Plutarch. Poggio Bracciolini (1380–1459) translated Xenophon, Diodorus, and Lucian. Francesco Filelfo (1398–1481) translated portions of Plutarch, Xenophon and Lysias. Lorenzo Valla (1407–1457) translated Thucydides and Herodotus. Marsilio Ficino (1433–1499) and his Platonic Academy translated Plato. Poliziano (1454–1494) translated Herodian and portions of Epictetus and Plutarch. Regiomontanus and George of Trebizond translated Ptolemy's Almagest. Important patrons were Basilios Bessarion (1403–1472) and Pope Nicholas V (1397–1455).

Armenia harbored libraries of Greek classical literature. An Armenian codex of Aristotle (†Δ) is one of the main sources in the text-critical apparatus of today's Greek text.

== Syriac translations ==
Syriac plays an important role in modern textual criticism even today. The Oxford Classical issue of the Greek text of Aristotle's Organon uses the sigla Ρ, Ι, and Γ, which are texts dating from Christian possessions from the 6th to 8th century.

Syriac translations played a major role for the later reception into Arabic. These translators from Syriac were mostly Nestorian and Jacobite Christians, working in the two hundred years following the establishment of the Abbasid caliphate. The most important translator of this group was the Syriac-speaking Christian Hunayn Ibn Ishaq (809-873), known to the Latins as Joannitius.

== Western Roman Empire ==
Classical Greek learning was firmly found in every metropolis of the Roman empire, including in Rome itself.

In the 4th century, the Roman grammarian Marius Victorinus translated two of Aristotle's books, about logic, into Latin: the Categories and On Interpretation (De Interpretatione). A little over a century later, most of Aristotle's logical works, except perhaps for the Posterior Analytics, had been translated by Boethius, c. 510–512 (see: Corpus Aristotelicum). However, only Boethius's translations of the Categories and On Interpretation had entered into general circulation before the 12th century. All in all, only a few major works of Aristotle were never translated into Arabic. Of these, the fate of Politics in particular remains uncertain.

The rest of Aristotle's books were eventually translated into Latin, but over 600 years later, from about the middle of the 12th century. First, the rest of the logical works were finished, by using the translations of Boethius as the basis. Then came the Physics, followed by the Metaphysics (12th century), and Averroes' Commentary on Aristotle's Metaphysics (13th century), so that all works were translated by the mid-13th century.

A text like On the Soul, for instance, was unavailable in Latin in Christian Europe before the middle of the twelfth century. The first Latin translation is due to James of Venice (12th century), and has always been considered as the translatio vetus (ancient translation). The second Latin translation (translatio nova, new translation) was made from the Arabic translation of the text around 1230, and it was accompanied by Averroes's commentary; the translator is generally thought to be Michael Scot. James's translatio vetus was then revised by William of Moerbeke in 1266–7, and became known as the "recensio nova" (new recension), which was the most widely read version. On the Soul ended up becoming a component of the core curriculum of philosophical study in most medieval universities, giving birth to a rich tradition of commentaries, especially c. 1260–1360.

Although Plato had been Aristotle's teacher, most of Plato's writings were not translated into Latin until over 200 years after Aristotle. In the Middle Ages, the only book of Plato in general circulation was the first part of the dialogue Timaeus (to 53c), as a translation, with commentary, by Calcidius (or Chalcidius). The Timaeus describes Plato's cosmology, as his account of the origin of the universe. In the 12th century, Henry Aristippus of Catania made translations of the Meno and the Phaedo, but those books were in limited circulation. Some other translations of Plato's books disappeared during the Middle Ages. Finally, about 200 years after the rediscovery of Aristotle, in the wider Renaissance, Marsilio Ficino (1433–99) translated and commented on Plato's complete works.

=== Boethius ===
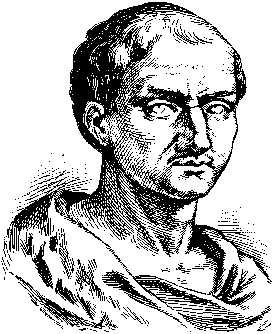
The Roman philosopher Boethius, who translated a large portion of the Greek classics into Latin.

In Rome, Boethius propagated works of Greek classical learning. Boethius intended to pass on the great Greco-Roman culture to future generations by writing manuals on music and astronomy, geometry, and arithmetic.

Several of Boethius' writings, which were largely influential during the Middle Ages, drew from the thinking of Porphyry and Iamblichus. Boethius wrote a commentary on the Isagoge by Porphyry, which highlighted the existence of the problem of universals: whether these concepts are subsistent entities which would exist whether anyone thought of them, or whether they only exist as ideas. This topic concerning the ontological nature of universal ideas was one of the most vocal controversies in medieval philosophy.

Besides these advanced philosophical works, Boethius is also reported to have translated important Greek texts for the topics of the quadrivium. His loose translation of Nicomachus's treatise on arithmetic (De institutione arithmetica libri duo) and his textbook on music (De institutione musica Libri quinque, unfinished) contributed to medieval education. De arithmetica, begins with modular arithmetic, such as even and odd, evenly even, evenly odd, and oddly even. He then turns to unpredicted complexity by categorizing numbers and parts of numbers.

His translations of Euclid on geometry and Ptolemy on astronomy, if they were completed, no longer survive. Boethius made Latin translations of Aristotle's De interpretation and Categories with commentaries. These were widely used during the Middle Ages.

=== Early Middle Ages in the Western Provinces ===
In the Western Provinces (what today is considered Western Europe's heartland), the collapsing Roman empire lost a number of Greek manuscripts which were not preserved by monasteries. However, due to the expense and dearth of writing materials, monastic scribes could recycle old parchments. The parchments could be reused after scraping off the ink of the old texts, and writing new books on the previously used parchment, creating what is called a palimpsest. Fortunately for modern scholars, the old writing can still be retrieved, and some valuable works, which would have otherwise been lost, have been recovered in this way. As the language of Roman aristocrats and scholars, Greek died off along with the Roman Empire in the West, and by 500 CE, almost no one in Western Europe was able to read (or translate) Greek texts, and with the rise of the Islamic Empire, the west was further cut off from the language. After a while, only a few monasteries in the west had Greek works, and even fewer of them copied these works (mainly the Irish). Some Irish monks had been taught by Greek and Latin missionaries who probably had brought Greek texts with them.

=== Late Middle Ages: William of Moerbeke ===
William of Moerbeke was one of the most prolific and influential translators of Greek philosophical texts in the middle half of the thirteenth century. Little is known of William's life. He was born probably in 1215 in the village of Moerbeke, now in Belgium, and probably entered the Dominican priory in Leuven as a young man. Most of his surviving work was done during 1259–72.

William's contribution to the "recovery" of Aristotle in the 13th century undoubtedly helped in forming a clearer picture of Greek philosophy, and particularly of Aristotle, than was given by the Arabic versions on which they had previously relied, and which had distorted or obscured the relation between Platonic and Aristotelian systems of philosophy. William's translation of Proclus was also important, demonstrating that the influential book Liber de Causis, was not a genuine work of Aristotle, but rather derived from Proclus' Elementatio Theologica.

According to a tradition originating in the later Middle Ages, William knew Thomas Aquinas and was commissioned by him to make some of the translations. But there is no contemporary record of the friendship or the commissions. If they did meet, it is most likely during the three or four years Aquinas was working at Orvieto, i.e. not before the election of Pope Urban IV in August 1261, who invited Aquinas to serve at the Papal court, and not after 1265, when Aquinas left for Rome. His translation of De motu animalium is cited by Thomas in Summa Contra Gentiles, probably completed in 1264.

== Arabic translations and commentary ==
Arabic logicians had inherited Greek ideas after they had invaded and conquered Egypt and the Levant. Their translations and commentaries on these ideas worked their way through the Arab West into Spain and Sicily, which became important centers for this transmission of ideas.

Western Arabic translations of Greek works (found in Iberia and Sicily) originates in the Greek sources preserved by the Byzantines. These transmissions to the Arab West took place in two main stages.

=== First period: Greek–Arabic translations ===
An Arab's depiction of Sophocles teaching his students.

==== Umayyads ====
The first period of transmission during 8th and 9th centuries was preceded by a period of conquest, as Arabians took control of previously Hellenized areas such as Egypt and the Levant in the 7th century. At this point they first began to encounter Greek ideas, though from the beginning, some of them were hostile to classical learning. Because of this hostility, the religious Caliphs could not support scientific translations. Translators had to seek out wealthy business patrons rather than religious ones. Until Abbasid rule in the 8th century, however, there was little work in translation. Most knowledge of Greek during Umayyad rule was gained from those scholars of Greek who remained from the Byzantine period, rather than through widespread translation and dissemination of texts. A few scholars argue that translation was more widespread than is thought during this period, but theirs remains the minority view.

==== Abbasids ====
The main period of translation was during Abbasid rule. The 2nd Abbasid Caliph al-Mansur moved the capital from Damascus to Baghdad. Here he founded a great library, The House of Wisdom, containing Greek Classical texts. Al-Mansur ordered this rich fund of world literature translated into Arabic. Under al-Mansur and by his orders, translations were made from Greek, Syriac, and Persian, the Syriac and Persian books being themselves translations from Greek or Sanskrit.

The 6th-century King of Persia, Anushirvan (Chosroes I) the Just, had introduced a number of Greek ideas into his kingdom. Aided by this knowledge and juxtaposition of beliefs, the Abbasids considered it valuable to look at Islam with Greek eyes, and to look at the Greeks with Islamic eyes. Abbasid philosophers also pressed the idea that Islam had from the very beginning stressed the gathering of knowledge as important to the religion. These new lines of thought allowed the work of amassing and translating Greek ideas to expand as it never before had.

===== Baghdad's House of Wisdom =====
The Caliph al-Mansur was the patron who did most to attract the Nestorian physicians to the city of Baghdad which he had founded, and he was also a prince who did much to encourage those who set themselves to prepare Arabic translations of Greek, Syriac, and Persian works. Still more important was the patronage given by the Caliph al-Ma'mun, who in A.H. 217 (= A.D. 832) founded a school at Baghdad, suggested no doubt by the Nestorians and Zoroastrian schools already existing, and this he called the Bayt al-Hikma or "House of Wisdom", and this he placed under the guidance of Yuhanna ibn Masawaih (d. A.H. 243 = A.D. 857), who was an author both in Syriac and Arabic, and learned also in the use of Greek. His medical treatise on "Fevers" was long in repute and was afterwards translated into Latin and into Hebrew.

The most important work of the academy however was done by Masawaih's pupils and successors, especially Abu Zayd Hunayn ibn Ishaq al-Ibadi (d. 263 A.H. = A.D. 876), the Nestorian physician to whom we have already referred as translating into Syriac the chief medical authorities as well as parts of Aristotle's Organon. After studying at Baghdad under Yahya he visited Alexandria and returned, not only with the training given at what was then the first medical school, but with a good knowledge of Greek which he employed in making translations in Syriac and Arabic.

Later the Caliph al-Mamun also sent emissaries to the Byzantines to gather Greek manuscripts for his new university, making it a center for Greek translation work in the Arab world. At first only practical works, such as those on medicine and technology were sought after, but eventually works on philosophy became popular.

Most scholars agree that during this period rhetoric, poetry, histories, and dramas were not translated into Arabic, since they were viewed as serving political ends which were not to be sought after in the Islamic states. Instead, philosophical and scientific works were almost the entire focus of translation. This has been disputed by a minority of scholars, however, who argue that stories such as the Arabian Nights carry clear parallels to Greek literature—evidence that some Muslims were familiar with Greek humanities more than is thought.

=== After translation: Arabic commentary on Greek works ===
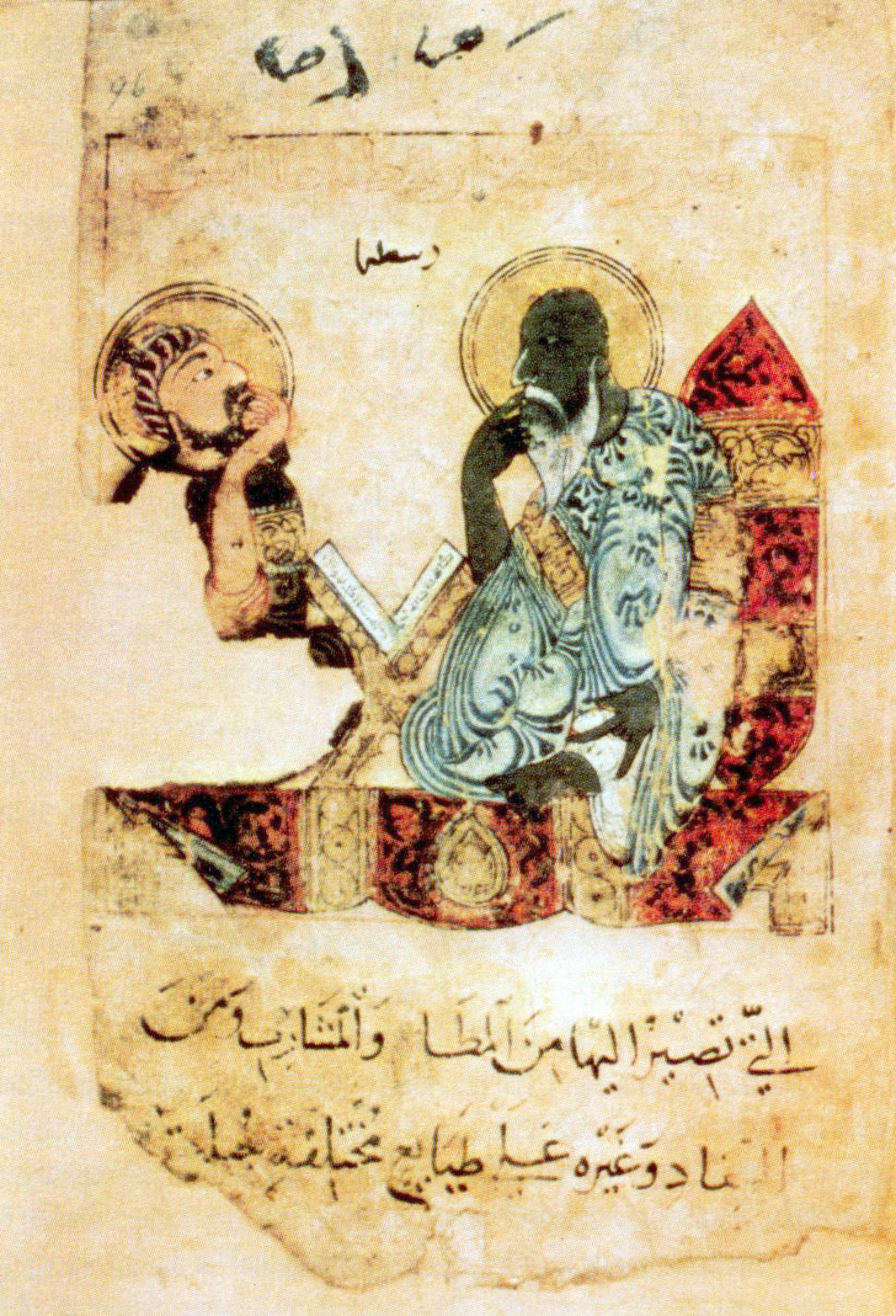
A medieval Arabic representation of Aristotle teaching a student.

Al-Kindi (Alkindus), a famous logician and prominent figure in the House of Wisdom, is unanimously hailed as the "father of Islamic or Arabic philosophy". His synthesis of Greek philosophy with Islamic beliefs met with much opposition, and at one point he was flogged by those opposed to his ideas. He argued that one could accept the Koran and other sacred texts, and work from that point to determine truth. Whenever he ran into an impasse, he would abandon the Greek ideas in favor of the Islamic faith. He is considered to be largely responsible for pulling the Near East out of a mystic and theological way of thinking into a more rationalistic mode. Previous to al-Kindi, for example, on the question of how the immaterial God of the Koran could sit on a throne in the same book, one theologist had said, “The sitting is known, its modality is unknown. Belief in it is a necessity, and raising questions regarding it is a heresy.” Few of al-Kindi's writings have survived, making it difficult to judge his work directly, but it is clear from what exists that he carefully worked to present his ideas in a way acceptable to other Muslims.

After Al-Kindi, several philosophers argued more radical views, some of whom even rejected revelation, most notably the Persian logician, Al-Razi or “Rhazes.” Considered one of the most original thinkers among the Persian philosophers, he challenged both Islamic and Greek ideas in a rationalist manner. Also, where Al-Kindi had focused on Aristotle, Al-Rhazi focused on Plato, introducing his ideas as a contrast.

After Al-Kindi, Al-Farabi (Alpharabius) introduced Neoplatonism through his knowledge of the Hellenistic culture of Alexandria. Unlike Al-Kindi or Al-Rhazi, Al-Farabi was hesitant to express his own feelings on issues of religion and philosophy, choosing rather to speak only through the words of the various philosophies he came across.

Decades after Al-Farabi, Ibn Sina (Avicenna) compiled the ideas of a number of Muslim philosophers of the previous centuries and established a new school which is known as Avicennism. After this period, Greek philosophy went into a decline in the Islamic world. Theologians such as Al-Ghazali argued that a number of realms of logic only worked in theory, not in reality. His ideas would later influence Western European religious ideas. The Andalusian philosopher Ibn Rushd (Averroes) refuted Al-Ghazali's The Incoherence of the Philosophers with his treatise The Incoherence of the Incoherence. His works led to the philosophical school of Averroism.

By 1200, when philosophy was again revived in the Islamic world, Al-Kindi and Al-Farabi were no longer remembered, while Ibn Sina's compilation work still was. Ibn Sina, otherwise known as Avicenna, would later heavily influence European philosophical, theological and scientific thought, becoming known as “the most famous scientist of Islam” to multiple Western historians.

=== Western European reception of Greek ideas via the Islamic tradition ===
While Greek ideas gradually permeated the Islamic world, Muslims conquests extended to the European continent. Spain was conquered by the Umayyads around 700 AD, even reaching as far as Poitiers in Southern France by 732 (Battle of Tours). By 902 Sicily was conquered. With the aid of Greek and other ideas, Spain in particular quickly became the most heavily populated and thriving area in Europe. One of the rulers of Al-Andalus, Al-Hakam II, made an effort to gather books from all over the Middle East, creating a library which would later become a center for translation into Latin.

As books were gathered, so were a number of Muslim scholars who had studied Greek ideas in the east. For example, Muhammud ibn 'Abdun and 'Abdu'l-Rahman ibn Ismail came to Spain and introduced a number of ideas about medicine as well as several of the works of Aristotle and Euclid. Ibn Bajjah (known as "Avempace") and Ibn Rushd (known as "Averroes") were among the other famous philosophers of Spain who furthered the expansion of Greek ideas in medicine and philosophy.

Prior to Averroes (Ibn Rushid), a number of philosophers had confused Aristotle with Plotinus, a Hellenized Egyptian who founded Neoplatonism and had mixed Aristotle's ideas with Plato's. Averroes rediscovered the "true" Aristotle by translating key texts reintroducing him to Al-Andalus. He also challenged Al-Ghazali's largely anti-Greek philosophies and offered some of the best reconciliation of Islam and philosophy of the time. Key to his arguments was the idea that although there was only one truth, that truth could be expressed in multiple ways, including both philosophy and religion. He even used the Qur'an to back up his arguments in favor of Greek philosophy and logic, especially the passage: "It is He, [O Muhammad] who has revealed the Book to you...some of its verses are unambiguous...and the others are ambiguous...only God and those confirmed in knowledge know its interpretation." Averroes argued that "those confirmed in knowledge" were philosophers.

The Scholastic philosophers and theologians of the Middle Ages such as Thomas Aquinas later called Averroes "The Commentator," and Michael the Scot translated several of Averroes' works within fifty years of his death. However, Averroes' reception in Western Europe contrasted with his ultimate rejection in Spain. Soon after Averroes, Greek ideas in the Arab lands were largely opposed by those who disliked anything not "truly Arab."

==== Arabic: Latin or Vernacular ====
While Muslims were translating and adding their own interpretations to Greek philosophies, the Latin West was still suspicious of pagan ideas. Leaders of the Orthodox Church in the Byzantine Empire also frowned upon philosophy, and the Empire had just gone through a period of plague, famine, and war. Further west, several key figures in European history who came after Boethius had strengthened the overwhelming shift away from Hellenistic ideas. For centuries, Greek ideas in Europe were all but non-existent, until the Eastern part of the Roman Empire – Byzantium – was sacked during the Fourth Crusade unlocking a number of Ancient Greek texts. Within Western Europe, only a few monasteries had Greek works, and even fewer of them copied these works.

There was a brief period of revival, when the Anglo-Saxon monk Alcuin and others reintroduced some Greek ideas during the Carolingian Renaissance of the 8th century. After Charlemagne's death, however, intellectual life again fell into decline. By the 12th century, however, scholastic thought was beginning to develop, leading to the rise of universities throughout Europe. These universities gathered what little Greek thought had been preserved over the centuries, including Boethius' commentaries on Aristotle. They also served as places of discussion for new ideas coming from new translations from Arabic throughout Europe.

By the 12th century, European fear of Islam as a military threat had lessened somewhat. Toledo, in Spain, had fallen from the Umayyads in 1085, Sicily and Jerusalem from the Fatimids in 1091 and 1099 respectively. These linguistic borderlands proved fertile ground for translators. These areas had been conquered by Arabic, Greek, and Latin-speaking peoples over the centuries and contained linguistic abilities from all these cultures. The small and unscholarly population of the Crusader Kingdoms in the Holy Land contributed little to the translation efforts, until the Fourth Crusade took most of the Byzantine Empire. Sicily, still largely Greek-speaking, was more productive; it had seen rule under Byzantines, Arabs, and Italians, and a number of them were fluent in Greek, Arabic, and Latin. Sicilians, however, were less influenced by Arabs and instead are noted more for their translations directly from Greek to Latin. Spain, on the other hand, was an ideal place for translation from Arabic to Latin because of a combination of rich Latin and Islamic cultures living side by side.

==== Spain and Sicily ====
As early as the 10th century, scholars in Andalusia had begun to gather translated texts, and in the latter half of that century began transmitting them to the rest of Europe. After the Reconquista of the 12th century, however, Spain opened even further for Christian scholars, who were now able to work in "friendly" religious territory. As these Europeans encountered Islamic philosophy, their previously held fears turned to admiration, and from Spain came a wealth of Islamic knowledge of mathematics and astronomy. Foreigners came to Spain to translate from all over Europe, and Toledo became a center for such travelers, since a number of its citizens wrote daily in both Arabic and Latin-based languages.

Although there was a huge amount of work being accomplished in Spain, there was no central school for translating and no real organized effort, as there had been at times among the Muslims. Translators came from multiple different backgrounds and translated for a number of different reasons. For example, non-Christian Jewish scholars participated by translating Arabic works which had already been translated into Hebrew, into Latin and Vulgate languages. Some scholars, however, have suggested that Raymond de Sauvetât, the Archbishop of Toledo, seems to have started an organized movement of support for translations, and multiple scholars who seem to be associated with him in documents may have translated two-by-two, working together.

Whether Raimond actually started a truly central, organized effort at translation, later generalized as the Toledo School of Translators, remains unknown. What is known is that most translations coming out of Spain dealt with either medicine or astronomy. Hugo of Santalla, for example, translated a large selection of Arabic works all dealing with astronomy, as well as tracing the history of astronomic thought through history, underscoring the work of the Greeks, Persians, Hellenists, and Arabs in one large preface to his volume.

By the 13th century, translation had declined in Spain, but it was on the rise in Italy and Sicily, and from there to all of Europe. Adelard of Bath, an Englishman, traveled to Sicily and the Arab lands, translating works on astronomy and mathematics, including the first complete translation of Euclid's Elements. Powerful Norman kings gathered men of high knowledge from Italy, and other areas, into their courts, as signs of prestige. Even the Byzantines experienced an Aristotelian revival in the mid-12th century, and gathered men from Italy as well.

Because some of Aristotle's newly translated views discounted the notions of a personal God, immortal soul, or creation, various leaders of the Catholic Church were inclined to censor those views for decades, such as lists of forbidden books in the Condemnations of 1210–1277 at the University of Paris. Meanwhile, Thomas Aquinas (c.1225–1274), at the end of that time period, was able to reconcile the viewpoints of Aristotelianism and Christianity, primarily in his work Summa Theologica (1265–1274).

== See also ==
- Latin translations of the 12th century
- Islamic contributions to Medieval Europe
- Science in the medieval Islamic world
- Scholasticism
- Thomism
- Toledo School of Translators
- Vivarium

== Bibliography ==
- Brickman, William W. “The Meeting of East and West in Educational History.” Comparative Education Review. (Oct 1961) 5.2 pgs. 82-89.
- Clagett, Marshall. “William of Moerbeke: Translator of Archimedes.” Proceedings of the American Philosophical Society. (Oct 1982) 126.5 pgs. 356-366.
- Fryde, E., The Early Palaeologan Renaissance, Brill 2000.
- Grant, E. The Foundations of Modern Science in the Middle Ages, Cambridge 1996.
- Grabmann 1946, "Guglielmo di Moerbeke, O.P., il traduttore delle opere di Aristotele", Miscellanea Historiae Pontificiae, vol. XI, fasc. 20, Rome, 1946.
- Grunebaum, Gustave E. von. “Greek Form Elements in the Arabian Nights.” Journal of the American Oriental Society. (Dec 1942) 62.4 pgs. 277-292 .
- Laughlin, Burgess. The Aristotle Adventure: a Guide to the Greek, Arabic, and Latin Scholars Who Transmitted Aristotle's Logic to the Renaissance. Flagstaff Ariz.: Albert Hale Pub., 1995.
- Lindberg, David C. (ed.). Science in the Middle Ages. Chicago: University of Chicago Press, 1978.
- Long, Pamela O. Technology and Society in the Medieval Centuries Byzantium, Islam, and the West, 500-1300. Washington DC: American Historical Association, 2003.
- Moller, Violet. The Map of Knowledge: A Thousand-Year History of How Classical Ideas Were Lost and Found. New York: Anchor Books, 2020.
- O'Leary, De Lacy (1922). Arabic Thought and its Place in History.
- Palencia, A. Gonzalez. “Islam and the Occident”, Hispania. (October 1935) 18.3 pgs. 245-276.
- Pingree, David. “Classical and Byzantine Astrology in Sassanian Persia.” Dumbarton Oaks Papers. (1989) 43 pgs. 227-239.
- Reynolds, L. D., and N. G. Wilson. Scribes and Scholars: A Guide to the Transmission of Greek and Latin Literature. 3rd ed. Oxford: Clarendon Press, 1991.
- Rosenthal, Franz (Ed. and trans.). The Classical Heritage in Islam. Berkeley: University of California Press, 1975.
- Walbridge, John. “Explaining Away the Greek Gods in Islam.” Journal of the History of Ideas. (Jul 1998) 59.3 pgs. 389-403.
- Watt, W. Montgomery. The Influence of Islam on Medieval Europe. Edinburgh: University Press, 1972.
