= Greco-Islamic tradition =

Greco-Islamic tradition (similarly, Greco-Islamic legacy, Greco-Islamic science, Greco-Islamic philosophy, and Greco-Islamic medicine) may refer to:

- Scholarship from the Islamic Golden Age, emphasising its roots in Greek philosophy and mathematics:
  - Islamic science
  - Islamic medicine
  - Islamic mathematics
  - Early Islamic philosophy
- The Islamic role in the transmission of Greek philosophical ideas in the Middle Ages
