= Leon (mathematician) =

Ancient Greek mathematician

Leon (Greek: Λέων) was a Greek mathematician and pupil of Neocleides. Leon was active from around 370 to 340 BCE. His book Elements was overshadowed by Euclid's work of the same name.

Proclus states the following in his Commentary on the First Book of Euclid's Elements:

But Neoclides was junior to Leodamas, and his disciple was Leon; who added many things to those thought of by former geometricians. So that Leon also constructed elements more accurate, both on account of their multitude, and on account of the use which they exhibit: and besides this, he discovered a method of determining when a problem, whose investigation is sought for, is possible, and when it is impossible.

== Sources ==
- François Lasserre (1987). De Léodamas de Thasos à Philippe d'Oponte : témoignages et fragments. pp. 79–86.
