= Elements of Theology =

Work by Proclus

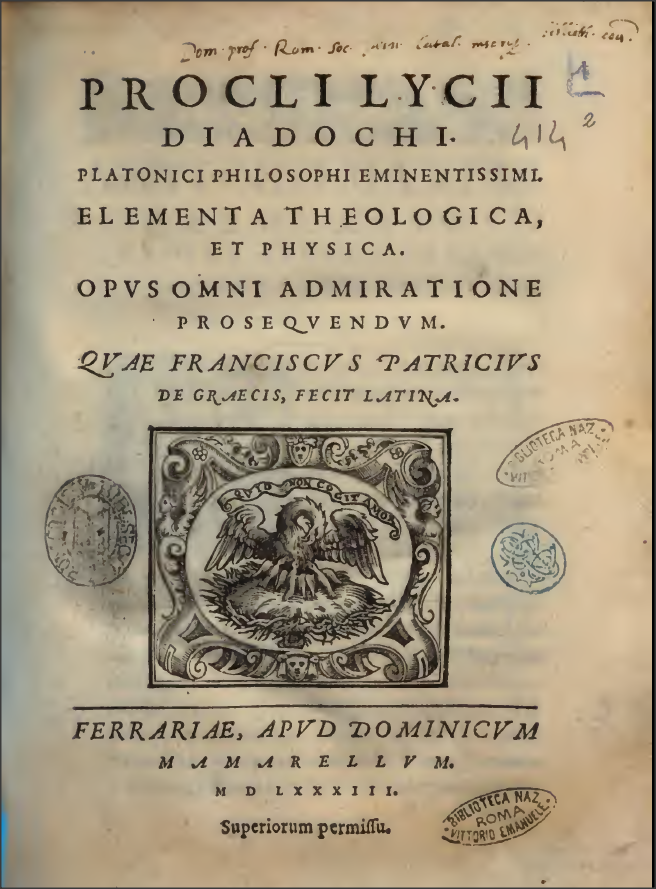
- Latin translation of Elements of Theology by Franciscus Patricius, 1583
- Author: Proclus
- Language: Koinē Greek (original)

The Elements of Theology (Ancient Greek: Στοιχείωσις θεολογική, romanized: Stoicheiōses Theologikē) is a work on Neoplatonic philosophy written by Proclus (c. 412–485). Conceived of as a systematic summary of Neoplatonic metaphysics, it has often served as a general introduction to this subject.

It was widely influential during the Middle Ages, especially through its 9th-century Arabic adaptation Kitāb al-Īḍāḥ fī al-khayr al-maḥḍ ("The Book on the Explanation of the Pure Good"), known in Latin as Liber de causis or "Book of Causes", which was falsely attributed to Aristotle. Proclus' work itself was first translated into Latin in 1268 by William of Moerbeke as Elementatio Theologica.

== Contents ==
The Elements of Theology is a compendium of 211 propositions that presents a concise systematization of Neoplatonic philosophy, with no attempt at radical innovation. Proclus uses the term 'theology' as in the study of the 'first principles' of all things. The propositions can be informally halved into dual parts: the first establish the unity of the many in the One, causality, participation, gradiation, procession, infinitude and eternity. The second half; on the henads, intelligences and souls.

== Legacy ==
An Arabic adaptation of the Elements of Theology was made in the 9th century, called the Kitāb al-Īḍāḥ fī al-khayr al-maḥḍ ("The Book on the Explanation of the Pure Good"). Falsely attributed to Aristotle, this work was in turn translated into Latin in the 12th century by Gerhard of Cremona under the name Liber de causis. Translations of the Kitāb al-Īḍāḥ fī al-khayr al-maḥḍ into Armenian and Hebrew also exist. Another way in which the Elements of Theology found its way into medieval Aristotelian philosophy is through the portions of the book that were interspersed in Arabic translations of works by the Peripatetic philosopher Alexander of Aphrodisias.

In the Byzantine world, the Elements of Theology was studied in its original Greek by Michael Psellos (11th century) and translated into Georgian by Psellos' pupil Ioanne Petritsi, who also wrote a commentary on it. A Christian refutation of the work was written by the bishop Nicolaus of Methone in the 12th century.

More widely influential, however, was the Liber de causis (the Latin version of the Kitāb al-Īḍāḥ fī al-khayr al-maḥḍ), which due to its attribution to Aristotle was regarded by medieval philosophers as a kind of appendix to Aristotle's Metaphysics. As such, it had also become a standard part of the university curriculum in the 13th century. This ended only when Thomas Aquinas, with the help of William of Moerbeke's 1268 translation of the Elements of Theology (Latin: Elementatio Theologica), was able to show that the Liber de causis was not a work written by Aristotle, but was actually based upon Proclus' work.

William of Moerbeke's Latin translations of Proclus' works were not widely read in the Middle Ages, though in the 14th century a Latin commentary on the Elements of Theology was written by Berthold of Moosburg. The Liber de causis was also still used by Dante (c. 1265–1321), who probably drew upon this work for the Neoplatonic ideas in his Divine Comedy.

== See also ==
- Theology of Aristotle, another Arabic adaptation of a Neoplatonic work (Plotinus' Enneads), which was falsely attributed to Aristotle.
