= Liber de causis =

9th century Arabic philosophical work

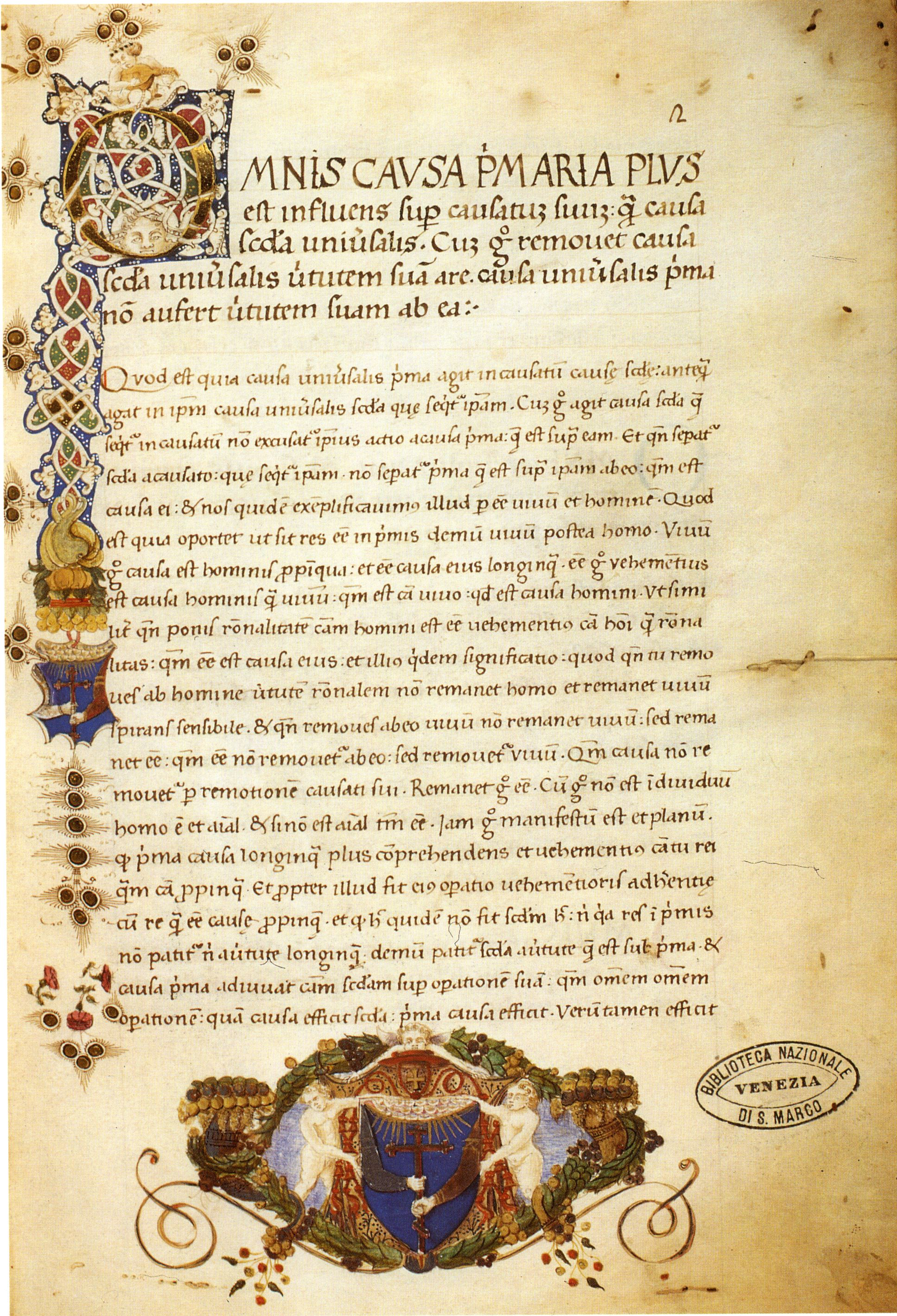
Manuscript copy of the Liber de causis from c. 1470. This copy once belonged to Cardinal Bessarion and is now in the Biblioteca Nazionale Marciana in Venice.

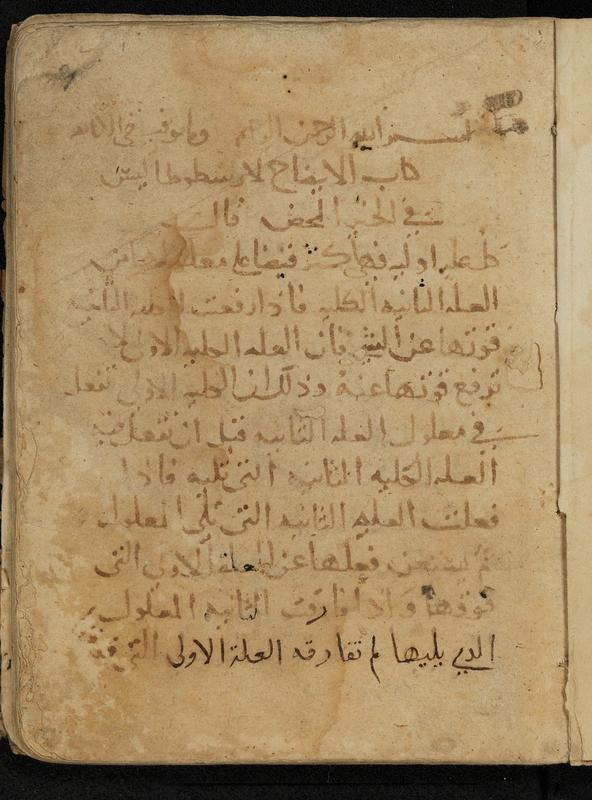
Leiden manuscript of al-Īḍāḥ fī'l-Khayr al-Maḥḍ, Or. 209.

The Liber de causis ("Book of Causes") is a philosophical work composed in Arabic in the 9th century. It was once attributed to Aristotle and became popular in West during the Middle Ages, after it was translated into Latin by Gerard of Cremona between 1167 and 1187. The original title was كتاب الإيضاح لأرسطوطاليس في الخير المحض Kitāb al-Īḍāḥ li-Arisṭūṭālis fī l-Khayr al-Maḥd, "The Book of Aristotle's Explanation of the Pure Good". Its Latin title, Liber de causis, came into use following its translation. The work was also translated into Armenian and Hebrew. Many Latin commentaries on the work are extant. Albertus Magnus attributed the Liber de causis to a certain David, a Jew, who in some sources appears as the author under the name of Avendauth, i.e. Ibn David.

The real authorship of the Liber remains a mystery, but most of the content is taken from the Elements of Theology of the Neoplatonic philosopher Proclus. This was first noticed by Thomas Aquinas, following William of Moerbeke's translation of Proclus' work into Latin. As such its author is now known as pseudo-Aristotle.

== Bibliography ==
=== Text and translations ===
==== Arabic ====
- Badawī, ʿAbd al-Raḥmān (1977). al-Iflāṭūniyya al-muḥdatha ʿinda al-ʿArab (2nd ed.). al-Kuwayt: Wakkālat al-Maṭbūʿāt. pp. 1–33. (edition of the Arabic)
- Bardenhewer, Otto (1882). Die pseudo-aristotelische Schrift ueber das reine Gute bekannt unter dem Namen Liber de Causis. Freiburg im Breisgau: Herder'sche Verlagschandlung. pp. 58–118. OCLC 6394425. (edition of the Arabic with German translation)

==== Latin ====
- Pattin, Adriaan, Le Liber de Causis. Edition établie a l'aide de 90 manuscrits avec introduction et notes, in Tijdschrift voor Filosofie 28 (1966) pp. 90–203

==== Hebrew ====
- Rothschild, Jean-Pierre: Les traductions hébraïques du Liber de causis latin. Dissertation Paris 1985, Bd. 1, S. 172–243 (synoptic edition of parts of the Hebrew translations)

==== Translations in modern languages ====
- Albayrak, Mehmet Barış: Nedenler Kitabı (Liber de Causis), Notos Yayınları, 2014. (Türkçe çeviri)
- Baumgarten, Alexander. Pseudo-Aristotel, Liber de causis, traducere, note şi comentariu de Alexander Baumgarten, Univers Enciclopedic, București, 2002 (Romanian translation)
- Brand, Dennis J. (ed.), tr. The Book of Causes: Liber de Causis (English translation): 1st ed. 1984 Marquette University Press, 2nd ed. 2001 Niagara University Press
- Magnard, Pierre; Boulnois, Olivier; Pinchard, Bruno; Solere, Jean-Luc. La demeure de l'être. Autour d'un anonyme. Etude et traduction du Liber de Causis, Paris 1990, Vrin (French translation)
- Schönfeld, Andreas. Liber de causis: Das Buch von den Ursachen, repr. 2005 Meiner Felix Verlag Gmbh ISBN 978-3-7873-1705-9: Latin text, German translation

=== Commentaries ===
- Albertus Magnus, Liber de causis et processu universitatis a prima causa (Latin)
- Calma, Dragos, ed. (2016). Neoplatonism in the Middle Ages: New Commentaries on 'Liber de Causis' and 'Elementatio Theologica'. Studia Artistarum. Vol. 42. Turnhout: Brepols. doi:10.1484/M.SA-EB.5.111556. ISBN 978-2-503-55474-7. (in 2 volumes)
- D'Ancona, Cristina: Tommaso d'Aquino, Commento al Libro delle cause. Rusconi, Milano 1986: commentary by Thomas Aquinas
- Sancti Thomae de Aquino super librum De Causis expositio (Latin)

=== Secondary literature ===
- Alonso, Manuel Alonso. Las fuentes literarias del Liber de causis. Al-Andalus: revista de las escuelas de estudios árabes de Madrid y Granada, (10), 1945, pp. 345–382.
- Bächli-Hinz, Andreas. Monotheismus und neuplatonische Philosophie: Eine Untersuchung zum pseudo-aristotelischen Liber de causis und dessen Rezeption durch Albert den Großen, Frankfurt, Academia Verlag, 2002.
- Calma, Dragos, ed. (2016). Neoplatonism in the Middle Ages: New Commentaries on 'Liber de Causis' and 'Elementatio Theologica'. Studia Artistarum. Vol. 42. Turnhout: Brepols. doi:10.1484/M.SA-EB.5.111556. ISBN 978-2-503-55474-7. (in 2 volumes)
- Calma, Dragos, ed. (2019). Reading Proclus and the Book of Causes, Volume 1: Western Scholarly Networks and Debates. Studies in Platonism, Neoplatonism, and the Platonic Tradition. Vol. 22. Leiden: Brill. doi:10.1163/9789004395114. ISBN 978-90-04-34510-2.
- Calma, Dragos, ed. (2020). Reading Proclus and the Book of Causes, Volume 2: Translations and Acculturations. Studies in Platonism, Neoplatonism, and the Platonic Tradition. Vol. 26. Leiden: Brill. doi:10.1163/9789004440685. ISBN 978-90-04-34511-9.
- Calma, Dragos, ed. (2022). Reading Proclus and the Book of Causes, Volume 3: On Causes and the Noetic Triad. Studies in Platonism, Neoplatonism, and the Platonic Tradition. Vol. 28. Leiden: Brill. doi:10.1163/9789004501331. ISBN 978-90-04-50132-4.
- D'Ancona, Cristina. Recherches sur le Liber de causis. Vrin, Paris 1995, ISBN 2-7116-1225-2
- D'Ancona, Cristina; Taylor, Richard C. "Le Liber de causis", in: Richard Goulet and others (ed.): Dictionnaire des philosophes antiques, CNRS, Paris 2003, ISBN 2-271-06175-X, S. 599–647
- Dodds, E. R. (1963). Proclus: The Elements of Theology. A Revised Text with Translation, Introduction, and Commentary (2nd ed.). London: Oxford University Press. ISBN 0-19-814097-5.
- Helmig, Christoph; Steel, Carlos (2015). "Proclus". In Zalta, Edward N. (ed.). The Stanford Encyclopedia of Philosophy.
- Megías, Paloma Llorente. Liber de Causis: Índice y Concordancia, Florence, Olschki 2004.
- Ricklin, Thomas. Die 'Physica' und der 'Liber de causis' im 12. Jahrhundert. Zwei Studien. University press, Freiburg (Switzerland) 1995, ISBN 3-7278-0994-9
- Taylor, Richard C. "The Kalām fī maḥḍ al-khair (Liber de causis) in the Islamic Philosophical Milieu" in: Jill Kraye and others (eds.): Pseudo-Aristotle in the Middle Ages, Warburg Institute, London 1986, ISBN 0-85481-065-X, S. 37–52

== See also ==
- Theology of Aristotle, another 9th-century Arabic adaptation of a Neoplatonic work (Plotinus' Enneads) falsely attributed to Aristotle
