= Adriaan Pattin =

Belgian historian of medieval philosophy

Adriaan Pattin (1914–2005) was a Belgian historian of medieval philosophy. His 1966 edition of the Pseudo-Aristotelian Liber de Causis, although intended to be "provisional", was for decades the best version available to scholars.

== Life ==
Pattin was born in Hasselt, Belgium, on 17 June 1914 and joined the Missionary Oblates of Mary Immaculate at the age of 19. He made his vows in 1935 and was ordained to the priesthood in 1941. In 1947, he graduated Licentiate from the Higher Institute of Philosophy in the Catholic University of Leuven. In 1952, he obtained his doctorate with a thesis on being and essence in the philosophy of Thomas Aquinas. He also graduated Master of Arts from the University of Ottawa, where he later returned as a visiting professor. From 1962 until his retirement, he was a researcher attached to the De Wulf-Mansion Centre for Ancient and Medieval Philosophy in Leuven. He died in Veurne on 15 August 2005.

== Works ==
- De verhouding tussen zijn en wezenheid en de transcendentale relatie in de 2e helft der XIIIe eeuw (Brussels, Paleis der Akademiën, 1955)
- Le Liber de Causis. Edition établie a l'aide de 90 manuscrits avec introduction et notes, in Tijdschrift voor Filosofie, 28 (1966).
- Repertorium commentariorum Medii Aevi in Aristotelem latinorum quae in bibliothecis belgicis asservantur (Leuven University Press, 1978)
- Enkele beschouwingen betreffende de geschiedenis van de theologie en filosofie in de Belgische kloosters vóór 1796 (Brussels, Algemeen Rijksarchief, 2000)
