= Theodoric of Freiberg =

German theologian and physicist

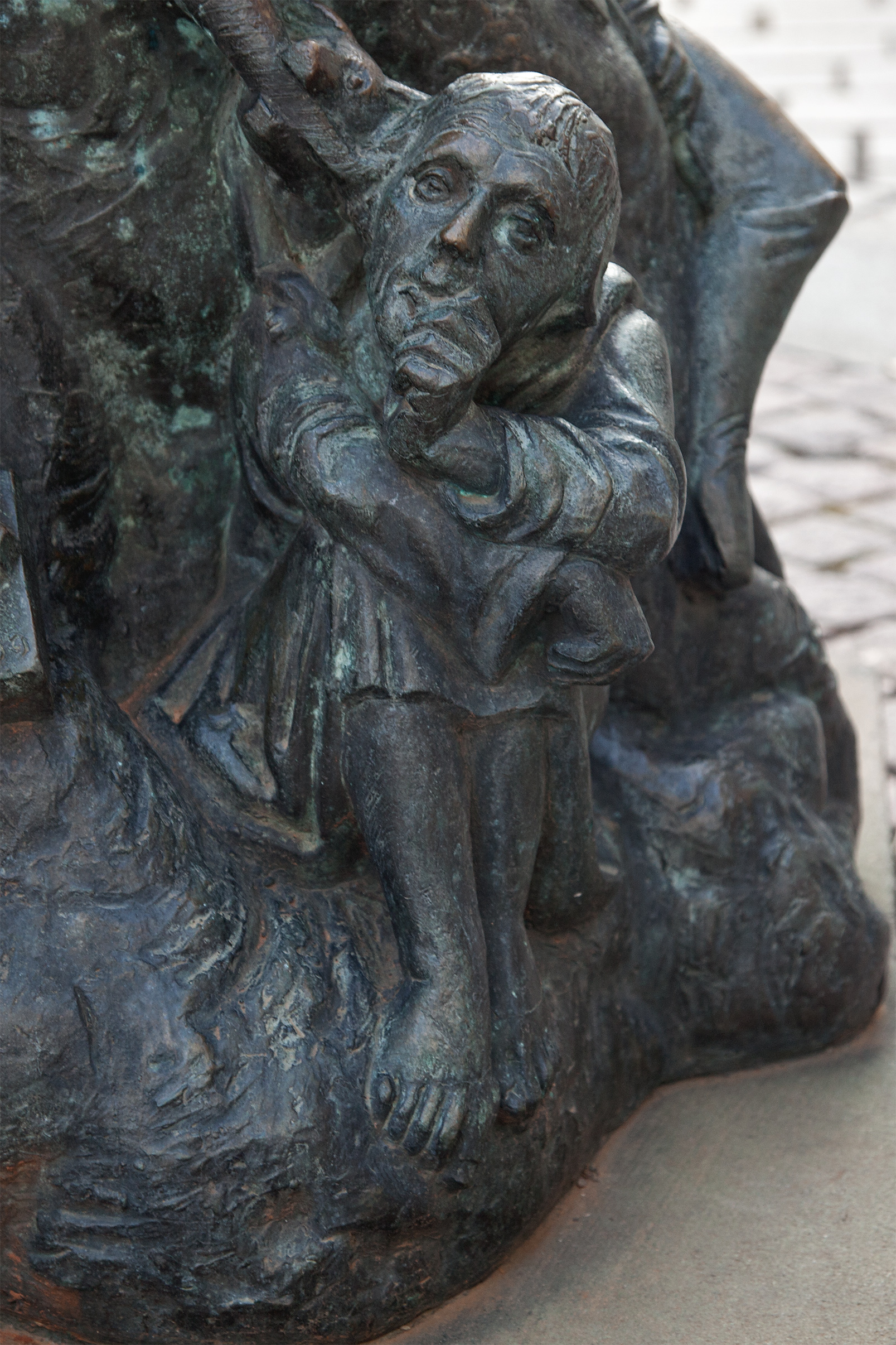

Theodoric of Freiberg (Note: Also known as Thierry de Fribourg, Thierry of Freburg, Dietrich of Freiberg (German: Dietrich von Freiberg), Theodoricus Teutonicus de Vrîberg, or simply Meister Dietrich.) (/θiˈɒdərɪk/; German: Dietrich Von Freiberg; c. 1250 – c. 1311) was a German member of the Dominican order and a theologian, philosopher, and physicist. He was named provincial of the Dominican Order in 1293, Albert the Great's old post. He is considered one of the notable philosophers and theologians of the Middle Ages based on his career and writings.

== Early life ==
Theodoric became a Dominican friar very early on in his life, and he studied and taught at the local convent in Freiberg around the year 1271 (Teske 2003). He lived around the time of Albert the Great (1193 to 1280) (Fuhrer 1992) and was greatly inspired by him. Though other philosophers at this time followed in Albert's footsteps as well, Theodoric "showed the most marked tendency to Albert's universality of interests" (Fuhrer 1992). From the dates of Albert's life, we can assume that Theodoric was still young when Albert's career was almost at its end, and no assumption can be made as to whether or not Theodoric ever met or studied under Albert. In medieval documents he is assigned the title of "magister", which tells us he had a great deal of university training at an advanced level (Fuhrer 1992).

== Career and early works ==
After teaching in Freiberg for some time, he journeyed to Paris to study there between the years 1272 to 1274 (Gillispie 2008), although we do not know with whom he may have studied. In a book titled Treatise on the Intellect and the Intelligible translated by M.L. Fuhrer, Fuhrer writes that in the second part of a treatise Theodoric talks about a "solemn master" in Paris. Fuhrer goes on to say that Henry of Ghent was known as "doctor solemnis" by his students, but ultimately states that there can be no certainty that they actually met or knew each other.

Theodoric then returned home to Germany for a while before coming back to Paris. Here he began his lectures on the Sentences in 1281 (Pasnau 2010). Exactly how long he remained in Paris in not clear, but it is agreed that he was made the prior of the Dominican convent in Würzburg around 1293 (Fuhrer 1992). Further sources indicate that he was appointed provincial of Teutonia in 1293 as well (Somerset, Fiona 1998). Theodoric was then "promoted" to the Provincial Superior for the province of Germany, the position previously held by Albert the Great (Pasnau 2010, Fuhrer 1992). Around the years 1296 and 1297 he was named "master of theology" in Paris, where he taught up to around 1300 (Teske 2008). Theodoric became one of the two Germans - the other being Albertus Magnus) - to earn this title of magister in the thirteenth century. Theodoric was also present for the general chapter of the Dominican order at Toulouse and his name appears in the general chapter of the order in Piacenza. The last position Theodoric was appointed to was Vicar provincial of Germany in 1310 (Gillispie 2008). His name does not appear in any kind of document after this time.

== Physics ==
While 13th century authors failed to provide an accurate explanation for the rainbow, at the turn of the fourteenth century Theodoric was able to give one of the first correct geometrical analyses of this phenomenon, which was "probably the most dramatic development of 14th- and 15th-century optics".

Drawing from his two earlier works on light and colour, he wrote De iride et radialibus impressionibus (On the Rainbow and the impressions created by irradiance, c. 1304-1311), relying on geometry, experiment, falsification and other methods. Among other properties he explained in detail:

- the colors of the primary and secondary rainbows
- the positions of the primary and secondary rainbows
- the path of sunlight within a drop: light beams are refracted when entering the atmospheric droplets, then reflected inside the droplets and finally refracted again when leaving them.
- the formation of the rainbow: he explains the role of the individual drops in creating the rainbow
- the phenomenon of color reversal in the secondary rainbow

Using spherical flasks and glass globes filled with water, Theodoric was able to simulate the water droplets during rainfall. Still in its early stages, experimental instrumentation would later expand to be used primarily for making measurements, extending the human senses and creating an isolated environment for the experimenter. During his experimentation with these glass globes, he was correct in asserting that the colors formed by the interaction of sunlight with the water droplets.

Recently, scientists have found evidence of the experimental instrumentation used by him. Currently on loan to universities in Providence, Rhode Island, the instrumentation does, indeed, simulate a droplet of water by which sunlight is reflected and refracted, thereby creating a rainbow. He studied refraction and reflection using transparent and opaque bodies (e.g. magnifying glasses, plane, convex and concave mirrors, prisms, and transparent crystal spheres and beryls). His experiments led to an explanation of the reflection/refraction phenomenon of drops of water in clouds that form the rainbow.

One of Theodoric's contemporaries, Kamal al-Din al-Farisi, offered the same experimentally-established explanation of the rainbow (without any contacts between them) in his Kitab tanqih al-manazir (The Revision of the Optics). Both authors however relied on the Book of Optics by Ibn al-Haytham (Alhacen)/ Alhazen.

== Theology ==
Theodoric's theological works tend to be heavily Neoplatonic, while his more secular philosophical works are more Aristotelian. Theodoric disagreed with Thomas Aquinas on certain metaphysical issues, and seems to have written in opposition to particular works by Aquinas.

He had a remarkable influence on the 10 years younger Meister Eckhart, mainly via the treatises De visione beatifica (Of the beatific vision) and De intellectu et intelligibili (Of the intellect and the intelligible). Particularly, his theory of transcendentals clarified Eckhart's theory of the negatio negationis. It stressed the negative moment that determines privatio in general even in its privatio privationis formulation. One of his extraordinary contributions to medieval philosophy was a theory of the soul that equalled the Aristotelian notion of "agent intellect" and the Augustinian notion of abditum mentis (i.e. the hiddenness, or hidden place of the soul).

The theory of the agent intellect says that in knowing, the mind is not merely passive, it has to work on producing a conception of its object, a conception which is then received and retained by the passive part of the mind. The hiddenness of the soul, in turn, is the ground of the soul in which God's image is imprinted, a spiritual apex of man's being by which he transcends space and time.

== Works ==
=== Theological works ===
- De visione beatifica
- De corpore Christi mortuo
- De dotibus corporum gloriosorum
- De substantiis spiritualibus et corporibus futuræ resurrectionis.

=== Philosophical works ===
- De habitibus
- De ente et essentia
- De magis et minus
- De natura contrariorum
- De cognitione entium separatorum et maxime animarum separatarum
- De intelligentiis et motoribus cælorum
- De corporibus cælestibus quoad naturam eorum corporalem
- De animatione cæli
- De accidentibus
- De quiditatibus entium
- De origine rerum prædicamentalium
- De mensuris
- De natura et proprietate continuorum
- De intellectu et intelligibili.

=== Scientific works ===
- De luce et ejus origine
- De coloribus
- De iride et radialibus impressionibus
- De miscibilibus in mixto
- De elementis corporum naturalium.

=== Modern editions ===
- Opera omnia = Corpus Philosophorum Teutonicorum Medii Ævi, Hamburg, Felix Meiner Verlag, vol. 1-4:
  - Burckhard Mojsisch (ed.), Schriften zur Intellekttheorie, Hamburg, 1977.
  - Ruedi Imbach, Maria Rita Pagnoni-Sturlese, Hartmund Steffan et Loris Sturlese (eds.), Schriften zur Metaphysik und Theologie, Hamburg, 1980.
  - Jean-Daniel Cavigioli, Ruedi Imbach, Burckhard Mojsisch, Maria Rita Pagnoni-Sturlese, Rudolf Rehn et Loris Sturlese (eds.), Schriften zur Naturphilosophie und Metaphysik. Quæstiones, Hamburg, 1983.
  - Maria Rita Pagnoni-Sturlese, Rudolf Rehn, Loris Sturlese et William A. Wallace (eds.), Schriften zur Naturwissenschaft. Briefe, Hambourg, 1985.

=== English translations ===
- Dietrich of Frieberg (1992). "Treatise on the Intellect and the Intelligible", Milwaukee: Marquette University Press.

== See also ==
- Neoplatonism
- Proclus
- Berthold of Moosburg
- List of Roman Catholic scientist-clerics
