= Hermotimus of Colophon =

Ancient Greek mathematician

Hermotimus of Colophon (Greek: Ἑρμότιμος; fl. 4th century BC) was a Greek mathematician who lived and worked in ancient Colophon. He is known only from a single sentence by Proclus, probably summarizing a lost work of Eudemus of Rhodes. This sentence states that Hermotimus continued the research of Eudoxus and Theaetetus, discovered many of the propositions in Euclid's Elements, and wrote about theorems on loci.
