= Otto Bardenhewer =

German theologian and patrologist (1851–1935)

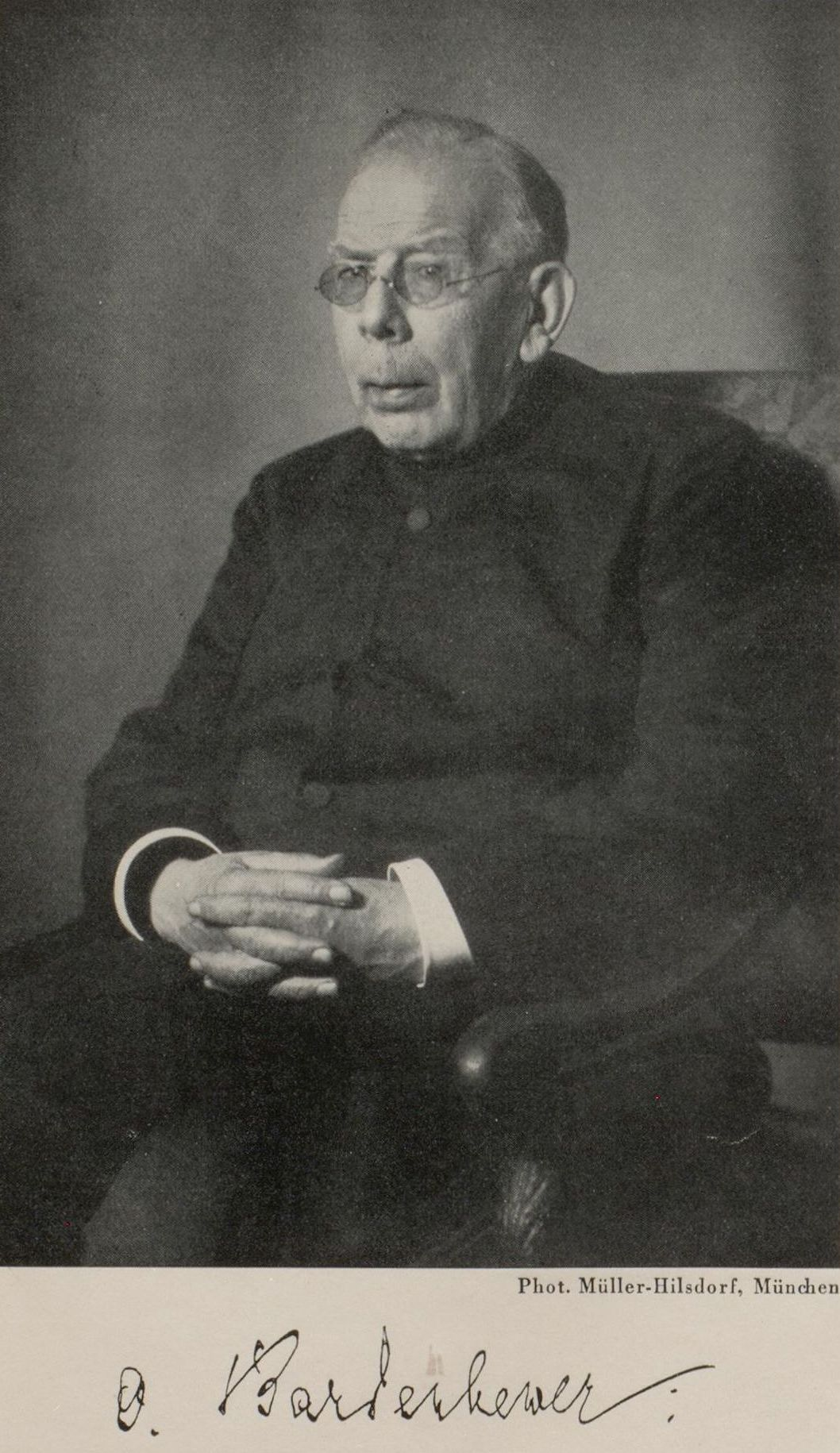
Photo and signature of Otto Bardenhewer

Bertram Otto Bardenhewer (Mönchengladbach, 16 March 1851 – Munich, 23 March 1935) was a German Catholic patrologist. His Geschichte der altkirchlichen Literatur is a standard work, re-issued in 2008. For Bardenhewer, a patrologist was not a literary historian of the Church Fathers, but a historian of dogmatic definitions.

== Life ==
He was born the son of a legal advisor and the grandson of a notary.

He was educated at the University of Bonn (Ph.D., 1873) and University of Würzburg. He became a Catholic priest in 1875. In 1879, he became privat-docent of theology at the Ludwig-Maximilians-Universität München. In 1884, he accepted a call to the University of Münster as professor of Old Testament. Two years later he returned to the Ludwig-Maximilians-Universität München, as a professor for New Testament exegesis and Biblical hermeneutics, a position he held until 1924.

== Works ==
- Hermetis Trismegisti qui apud Arabes fertur de castigatione animæ libellus (Bonn, 1873)
- Des heiligen Hippolytus von Rom Kommentar zum Buche Daniel (Freiburg, 1877)
- Polychronius, Bruder Theodors von Mopsuestia and Bischof von Apamea (1879)
- Die pseudo-aristotelische Schrift über die reine Gute, bekannt unter dem Namen "Liber de Causis" (1882)
- Patrologie (1894)
- Geschichte der altkirchlichen Literatur (5 vols., 1902 to 1932).
