= Neocleides =

4th century Greek mathematician

Neocleides (also Neoclides; Ancient Greek: Νεοκλείδης, Neokleidēs; fl. 4th century BC) was an ancient Greek mathematician. He was a younger contemporary of Plato and Leodamas of Thasos and himself served at the Platonic Academy. He also taught Leon. Otherwise, not much is known about him.

== Sources ==
- François Lasserre (1987). De Léodamas de Thasos à Philippe d'Oponte : témoignages et fragments. pp. 75–8.
