= Olympiodorus the Elder =

Olympiodorus the Elder (Greek: Ὀλυμπιόδωρος) was a 5th-century AD Neoplatonic philosopher who taught in Alexandria, then part of the Byzantine (Eastern Roman) Empire. He is most famous for being the teacher of the important Neoplatonist Proclus (412–485), whom Olympiodorus wanted his own daughter to marry. He lectured on Aristotle with considerable success.

Owing to the rapidity of his utterance and the difficulty of the subjects on which he treated, he was understood by very few. When his lectures were concluded, Proclus used to repeat the topics treated of in them for the benefit of those pupils who were slower in catching the meaning of their master. Olympiodorus had the reputation for being an eloquent man and a profound thinker. Nothing of his has come down to us in a written form.
