= Theology of Aristotle =

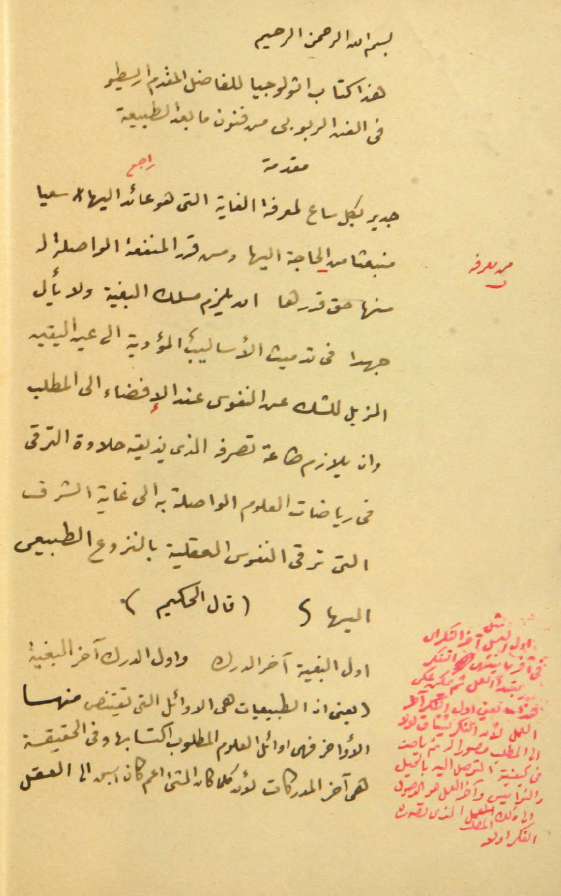
A page from a 1930s Egyptian copy of the Theology of Aristotle.

The Theology of Aristotle, also called Theologia Aristotelis (Arabic: أثولوجيا أرسطو, romanized: Athulujiya Aristu) is a paraphrase in Arabic of parts of Plotinus' Six Enneads along with Porphyry's commentary. It was traditionally attributed to Aristotle, but as this attribution is certainly untrue it is conventional to describe the author as "Pseudo-Aristotle". It had a significant effect on early Islamic philosophy, due to Islamic interest in Aristotle. Al-Kindi (Alkindus) and Avicenna, for example, were influenced by Plotinus' works as mediated through the Theology and similar works. The translator attempted to integrate Aristotle's ideas with those of Plotinus — while trying to make Plotinus compatible with Christianity and Islam, thus yielding a unique synthesis.

== Overview ==
The Theology of Aristotle, with The Letter on Divine Science and The Sayings of the Greek Sage, a collection of fragments, together form the Plotiniana Arabica. They seem to have been adapted by Ibn Na'ima al-Himsi, a Christian, and edited by al-Kindi, a Muslim (both writers were active in the ninth century).

There is also a longer version of the Theology, the authorship of which is uncertain. According to Shlomo Pines, it may have been written by Isma'ilis. Paul Fenton, on the other hand, thought it may have been derived from Egyptian Jews.

Just as there is an Arabic paraphrase of Plotinus' Six Enneads, blending it with Aristotle's thought, so also there is an Arabic paraphrase of Aristotle's De Anima, blending it with Plotinus' thought. Thus later Islamic philosophy, and European philosophy which built on the Islamic philosophical texts, were based on this Neoplatonic synthesis.

== Editions ==
=== Text ===
- Badawi, Abdurrahman, Aflutin Ind Al’Arab. Plotinus apud Arabes: Theologia Aristotelis et Fragmenta Quae Supersunt, Cairo 1955 (repr. Kuwait, 1977 and 1995): Arabic original
- A critical edition, following the order of the Arabic, is due to be published by the European Research Council project "Ideas, Advanced Grant 249431", under the supervision of Cristina d'Ancona.

=== Translations ===
- Franciscus Patricius, Mystica Aegyptiorum et Chaldaeorum: a Platone voce tradita, et ab Aristotele excepta et conscripta philosophia edente Francisco Patricio, Ferrara 1591: Latin translation
- H.-R. Schwyzer (ed.), Plotini Opera - Tomus II: Enneades IV-V . Plotiniana Arabica ad codicum fidem anglice vertit Geoffrey Lewis, Paris 1959: English translation, following the order of the text of Plotinus
- Luciano Rubio (tr.), Pseudo-Aristóteles, Teologia (Madrid 1978), Spanish
- Catarina Belo (tr.), A Teologia de Aristóteles (2010), translation into Portuguese, based on Badawi's text

== See also ==
- Liber de Causis, another 9th-century Arabic adaptation of a Neoplatonic work (Proclus' Elements of Theology) falsely attributed to Aristotle.
