= Leodamas of Thasos =

4th-century BC Greek mathematician

Leodamas of Thasos (Ancient Greek: Λεωδάμας ὁ Θάσιος; fl. 4th century BC) was a Greek mathematician and a contemporary of Plato, about whom little is known.

There are two references to Leodamas in Proclus's Commentary on Euclid:

At this time [Plato's time] also lived Leodamas of Thasos, Archytas of Tarentum, and Theaetetus of Athens, by whom the theorems [of geometry] were increased in number and brought into a more scientific arrangement. Younger than Leodamas was Neoclides and his pupil Leon, who added many discoveries.

Plato, it is said, taught this method [analysis] to Leodamas, who is also reported to have made many discoveries in geometry by means of it.

and one in Diogenes Laërtius' Lives and Opinions of Eminent Philosophers, Book 3 (Plato):

He [Plato] was the first to explain to Leodamas of Thasos the method of solving problems by analysis.

== Sources ==
- François Lasserre (1987). De Léodamas de Thasos à Philippe d'Oponte : témoignages et fragments. pp. 41–6.
- Thomas L. Heath (1949). Mathematics in Aristotle. p. 272. ISBN 9-781138-942417.
- Thomas L. Heath (1921). A History of Greek Mathematics. Vol. 1. pp. 120, 170, 212, 291, 319. ISBN 0-486-24073-8.
