= William of Moerbeke =

13th-century Flemish translator of Greek into Latin

The Rev. William of Moerbeke OP
- Born: 1215–35; Moerbeke, Holy Roman Empire
- Died: 1286; Corinth, Principality of Achaea
- Occupations: Philosopher, Catholic cleric, Translator

Philosophical work
- Era: Medieval philosophy
- Region: Western philosophy
- School: Scholasticism

William of Moerbeke, O.P. (Dutch: Willem van Moerbeke; Latin: Guillelmus de Morbeka; 1215–35 – c. 1286), was a prolific medieval translator of philosophical, medical, and scientific texts from Greek into Latin, enabled by the period of Latin rule of the Byzantine Empire. His translations were influential in his day, when few competing translations were available, and are still respected by modern scholars.

== Biography ==
Moerbeke was Flemish by birth (his surname indicating an origin in Moerbeke near Geraardsbergen), and a Dominican by vocation. Little is known of his life. In the spring of 1260, he was at either at Nicaea or at Nicles in the Peloponnese; in the autumn of the same year, he was at Thebes, where the Dominicans had been since 1253 and where he dated his translation of Aristotle's De partibus animalium.

For a time, he resided at the pontifical court of Viterbo (with evidence for his residence there in 22 November 1267, May 1268, and 15 June 1271), where he met the Latin translator Vitellius, who dedicated to him the Latin optical treatise Perspectiva (also named Opticae libri decem). Subsequently, Moerbeke moved to Orvieto in 1272 and appeared at the Council of Lyons (1274). Then, from 1278 until his death in 1286 (which probably occurred several months before the nomination of his successor as bishop in October 1286), he occupied the Latin Archbishopric of Corinth, a Catholic see established in the northeastern Peloponnese after the Fourth Crusade. It is not clear how much time he actually spent in his see; documents show him on mission in Perugia for the pope in 1283 and dictating his will there.

He was associated with the philosopher Thomas Aquinas, the mathematician John Campanus, the Polish naturalist and physician Vitello, and the astronomer Henri Bate of Mechlin, who dedicated to William his treatise on the astrolabe.

A little Greek village, Merbaka, with an exceptional late-13th-century church, is believed to have been named for him; it lies between Argos and Mycenae.

== Translations ==
At the request of Aquinas—so it is assumed; the source document is not clear—he undertook a complete translation of the works of Aristotle directly from the Greek or, for some portions, in a revision of existing translations. The reason for the request was that many of the copies of Aristotle in Latin then in circulation had originated in Spain (see Toledo School of Translators), from Arabic whose texts in turn had often passed through Syriac versions rather than being translated from the originals.

Aquinas wrote his commentary on Aristotle's De Anima, the translation of which from the Greek was completed by Moerbeke in 1267, while Aquinas was regent at the studium provinciale at the convent of Santa Sabina in Rome, the forerunner of the 16th-century College of Saint Thomas at Santa Maria sopra Minerva and the Pontifical University of Saint Thomas Aquinas, Angelicum.

William of Moerbeke was the first translator of the Politics (c. 1260) into Latin, as the Politics, unlike other parts of the Aristotelian corpus, had not been translated into Arabic. He was also responsible for one of only three medieval Latin translations of Aristotle's Rhetoric. William's translations were already standard classics by the 14th century, when Henricus Hervodius put his finger on their enduring value: they were literal (de verbo in verbo), faithful to the spirit of Aristotle, and without elegance. For several of William's translations, the Byzantine Greek manuscripts have since disappeared; without him the works would be lost.

William also translated John Philoponus and mathematical treatises by Hero of Alexandria and Archimedes. Especially important was his translation of the Elements of Theology of Proclus (made in 1268), because the Elements of Theology is one of the fundamental sources of the revived Neo-Platonic philosophical currents of the 13th century. His translation of Proclus' commentary on Plato's Parmenides, which included Plato's dialogue up to 142b in Stephanus pagination, made this text available in Latin for the first time. Some important shorter texts of Proclus, such as "On Providence", "On Providence and Fate", and "On the Existence of Evil", are preserved only in William of Moerbeke's translations.

The Vatican collection holds William's own copy of the translation he made of the greatest Hellenistic mathematician, Archimedes, with commentaries of Eutocius, which was made in 1269 at the papal court in Viterbo. William consulted two of the best Byzantine Greek manuscripts of Archimedes, both of which have since disappeared. The manuscript, in his own hand, was in the exhibition Rome Reborn: The Vatican Library & Renaissance Culture at the Library of Congress in 1993.

== In popular culture ==
In Umberto Eco's puzzle-mystery set in the 1320s, The Name of the Rose, there is some debate among the monks about Aristotle's Poetics (Second Day: Prime). Jorge of Burgos has condemned this book because knowledge of it came through the "infidel Moors" (as so much of Aristotle had indeed come). But the main character, William of Baskerville, knew that Aristotle's Poetics had recently been translated directly from Greek into Latin by William of Moerbeke.

== Sources ==
- Setton, Kenneth M. (1976). "The Papal Interregnum, Gregory X, and the Second Council of Lyon (1268-1274)". The Papacy and the Levant (1204-1571). Vol. I: The Thirteenth and Fourteenthn Centuries. The American Philosophical Society. pp. 106–122. ISBN 0-87169-114-0.
