= Proclus =

5th-century Greek Neoplatonist philosopher

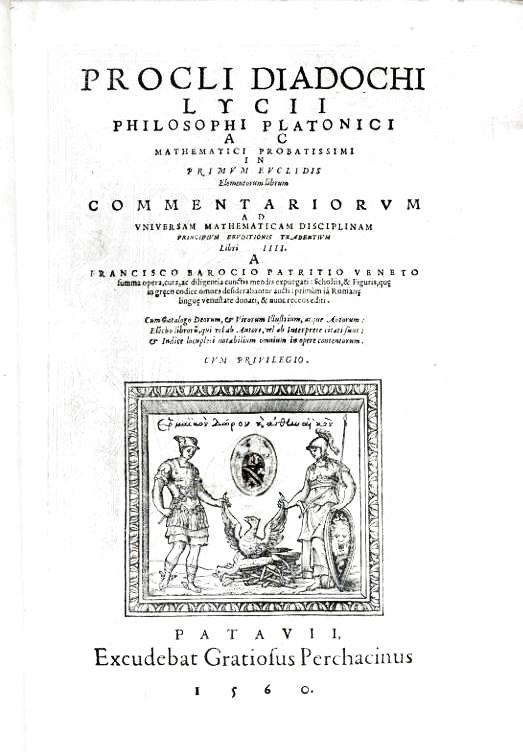
- The beginning of the first Latin edition of Proclus' Commentary on Euclid's Elements
- Born: Proclus Lycius; 412; Constantinople, Thracia, Eastern Roman Empire
- Died: 485 (aged 72–73); Athens, Achaea, Eastern Roman Empire
- Other name: "The Successor"

Education
- Academic advisors: Olympiodorus the Elder; Plutarch of Athens; Syrianus

Philosophical work
- Era: Ancient philosophy
- Region: Western philosophy
- School: Neoplatonism
- Notable students: Ammonius Hermiae; Asclepiodotus of Alexandria; Marinus of Neapolis
- Main interests: Metaphysics
- Notable ideas: Platonic theology

Proclus Lycius (/ˈprɒkləs laɪˈsiːəs/; 8 February 412 CE – 17 April 485 CE), called Proclus the Successor (Ancient Greek: Πρόκλος ὁ Διάδοχος, Próklos ho Diádokhos), was a Greek Neoplatonic philosopher, one of the last major classical philosophers of late antiquity. He set forth one of the most elaborate and fully developed systems of Neoplatonism and, through later interpreters and translators, exerted an influence on Byzantine philosophy, early Islamic philosophy, scholastic philosophy, and German idealism, especially G. W. F. Hegel, who called Proclus's Platonic Theology "the true turning point or transition from ancient to modern times, from ancient philosophy to Christianity."

== Biography ==
The primary source for the life of Proclus is the eulogy Proclus, or On Happiness that was written for him upon his death by his successor, Marinus. Marinus's biography set out to prove that Proclus reached the peak of virtue and attained eudaimonia. There are also a few details about the time in which he lived in the similarly structured Life of Isidore written by the philosopher Damascius in the following century.

According to Marinus, Proclus was born in 412 AD in Constantinople to a family of high social status from Lycia, and raised in Xanthus. He studied rhetoric, philosophy and mathematics in Alexandria, with the intent of pursuing a judicial position like his father. Before completing his studies, he returned to Constantinople when his rector, his principal instructor (one Leonas), had business there. Proclus became a successful practicing lawyer. However, the experience of the practice of law made Proclus realize that he truly preferred philosophy. He returned to Alexandria, and began determinedly studying the works of Aristotle under Olympiodorus the Elder. He also began studying mathematics during this period as well with a teacher named Heron (no relation to Hero of Alexandria, who was also known as Heron). As a gifted student, he eventually became dissatisfied with the level of philosophical instruction available in Alexandria, and went to Athens, philosophical center of the day, in 431 to study at the Neoplatonic successor of the New Academy, where he was taught by Plutarch of Athens (not to be confused with Plutarch of Chaeronea), Syrianus, and Asclepigenia; he succeeded Syrianus as head of the Academy in 437, and would in turn be succeeded on his death by Marinus of Neapolis. He lived in Athens as a vegetarian bachelor, prosperous and generous to his friends, until the end of his life, except for a one-year exile, to avoid pressure from Christian authorities. Marinus reports that he was writing seven hundred lines each day.

== Philosophy ==
One challenge with determining Proclus' specific doctrines is that the Neoplatonists of his time did not consider themselves innovators; they believed themselves to be the transmitters of the correct interpretations of Plato himself. Although the neoplatonic doctrines are much different from the doctrines in Plato's dialogues, it's often difficult to distinguish between different Neoplatonic thinkers and determine what is original to each one. For Proclus, this is largely only possible with Plotinus, the only other Neoplatonic writer for whom a significant amount of writings survive.

Proclus, like Plotinus and many of the other Neoplatonists, agreed on the three hypostases of Neoplatonism: The One (hen), The Intellect (nous) and The Soul (psyche), and wrote a commentary on the Enneads, of which only fragments survive. At other times he criticizes Plotinus' views, such as the prime mover. Unlike Plotinus, Proclus also did not hold that matter was evil, an idea that caused contradictions in the system of Plotinus. It is difficult to determine what, if anything, is different between the doctrines of Proclus and Syrianus: for the latter, only a commentary on Aristotle's Metaphysics survives, and Proclus never criticizes his teacher in any of his preserved writings.

The particular characteristic of Proclus's system is his elaboration of a level of individual ones, called henads, between the One which is before being and intelligible divinity. The henads exist "superabundantly", also beyond being, but they stand at the head of chains of causation (seirai) and in some manner give to these chains their particular character. He identifies them with the Greek gods, so one henad might be Apollo and be the cause of all things apollonian, while another might be Helios and be the cause of all sunny things. Each henad participates in every other henad, according to its character. What appears to be multiplicity is not multiplicity at all, because any henad may rightly be considered the center of the polycentric system. According to Proclus, philosophy is the activity which can liberate the soul from a subjection to bodily passions, remind it of its origin in Soul, Intellect, and the One, and prepare it not only to ascend to the higher levels while still in this life, but to avoid falling immediately back into a new body after death. Because the soul's attention, while inhabiting a body, is turned so far away from its origin in the intelligible world, Proclus thinks that we need to make use of bodily reminders of our spiritual origin. In emphasizing the importance of an embodied practice of philosophy, he agrees with the doctrines of theurgy put forward by Iamblichus. Theurgy is possible because the powers of the gods (the henads) extend through their series of causation even down to the material world. And by certain power-laden words, acts, and objects, the soul can be drawn back up the series, so to speak. Proclus himself was a devotee of many of the religions in Athens, considering that the power of the gods could be present in these various approaches.

== Works ==
=== Commentaries on Plato ===
The majority of Proclus's works are commentaries on dialogues of Plato (Alcibiades, Cratylus, Parmenides, Republic, Timaeus). In these commentaries, he presents his own philosophical system as a faithful interpretation of Plato, and in this he did not differ from other Neoplatonists, as he considered that "nothing in Plato's corpus is unintended or there by chance", that "Plato's writings were divinely inspired" (ὁ θεῖος Πλάτων ho theios Platon—the divine Plato, inspired by the gods), that "the formal structure and the content of Platonic texts imitated those of the universe", and therefore that they spoke often of things under a veil, hiding the truth from the philosophically uninitiated. Proclus was however a close reader of Plato, and quite often makes very astute points about his Platonic sources.

==== Commentary on Timaeus ====
In his commentary on Plato's Timaeus Proclus explains the role the Soul as a principle has in mediating the Forms in Intellect to the body of the material world as a whole. The Soul is constructed through certain proportions, described mathematically in the Timaeus, which allow it to make Body as a divided image of its own arithmetical and geometrical ideas.

=== Systematic works ===
In addition to his commentaries, Proclus wrote two major systematic works. The Elements of Theology (Στοιχείωσις θεολογική) consists of 211 propositions, each followed by a proof, beginning from the existence of the One (divine Unity) and ending with the descent of individual souls into the material world. The Platonic Theology (Περὶ τῆς κατὰ Πλάτωνα θεολογίας) is a systematization of material from Platonic dialogues, showing from them the characteristics of the divine orders, the part of the universe which is closest to the One.

We also have three essays, extant only in Latin translation: Ten doubts concerning providence (De decem dubitationibus circa providentiam); On providence and fate (De providentia et fato); On the existence of evils (De malorum subsistentia).

=== Other works ===
==== Commentary on Euclid's Elements ====
Proclus, the scholiast to Euclid, knew Eudemus of Rhodes' History of Geometry well, and gave a short sketch of the early history of geometry, which appeared to be founded on the older, lost book of Eudemus. The passage has been referred to as "the Eudemian summary", and determines some approximate dates, which otherwise might have remained unknown. The influential commentary on the first book of Euclid's Elements is one of the most valuable sources regarding the history of ancient mathematics, and its Platonic account of the status of mathematical objects was influential.

In this work, Proclus also listed the first mathematicians associated with Plato: a mature set of mathematicians (Leodamas of Thasos, Archytas of Taras, and Theaetetus), a second set of younger mathematicians (Neoclides, Eudoxus of Cnidus), and a third yet younger set (Amyntas, Menaechmus and his brother Dinostratus, Theudius of Magnesia, Hermotimus of Colophon and Philip of Opus). Some of these mathematicians were influential in arranging the Elements that Euclid later published.

==== Theology of Plato ====
Proclus authored a theology of Plato, which is text concerned with the divine hierarchies and their complex ramifications.

==== Others ====
A commentary on the Works and Days of Hesiod (incomplete); some scholia on Homer. A short treatise – apparently an extract – has been preserved in two manuscripts, entitled Περὶ τῆς καθ’ Ἕλληνας ἱερατικῆς τέχνης, that is to say, On the hieratic art according to the Greeks.

=== Lost works ===
A number of his Platonic commentaries are lost. In addition to the Alcibiades, the Cratylus, the Timaeus, and the Parmenides, he also wrote commentaries on the remainder of the dialogues in the Neoplatonic curriculum. He also wrote a commentary on the Organon, as well as prolegomena to both Plato and Aristotle.

== Legacy ==
Proclus exerted a great deal of influence on Medieval philosophy, though largely indirectly, through the works of the commentator Pseudo-Dionysius the Areopagite. This late-5th- or early-6th-century Christian Greek author wrote under the pseudonym Dionysius the Areopagite, the figure converted by St. Paul in Athens. Because of this pseudonym, his writings were taken to have almost apostolic authority. He is an original Christian writer, and in his works can be found a great number of Proclus's metaphysical principles.

Another important source for the influence of Proclus on the Middle Ages is Boethius's Consolation of Philosophy, which has a number of Proclus principles and motifs. The central poem of Book III is a summary of Proclus's Commentary on the Timaeus, and Book V contains the important principle of Proclus that things are known not according to their own nature, but according to the character of the knowing subject.

A summary of Proclus's Elements of Theology circulated under the name Liber de Causis (Book of Causes). This book is of uncertain origin, but circulated in the Arabic world as a work of Aristotle, and was translated into Latin as such. It had great authority because of its supposed Aristotelian origin, and it was only when Proclus's Elements were translated into Latin that Thomas Aquinas realised its true origin. Proclus's works also exercised an influence during the Renaissance through figures such as Nicholas of Cusa and Marsilio Ficino. The most significant early scholar of Proclus in the English-speaking world was Thomas Taylor, who produced English translations of most of his works.

The crater Proclus on the Moon is named after him.

== Works ==
- Elements of Theology:
  - Proclus, approximately (1992). The Elements of Theology = Diadoxos stoixeiōsis theologikē (Second ed.). Oxford. ISBN 9780198140979.
- Platonic Theology: A long (six volumes in the Budé edition) systematic work, using evidence from Plato's dialogues to describe the character of the various divine orders
  - The Six Books of Proclus, the Platonic Successor, on the Theology of Plato Thomas Taylor translation.
- Commentary on Plato's Alcibiades
  - Proclus (1971). Proclus' Commentary on Plato's Alcibiades I (Second ed.). Dordrecht. ISBN 9789401763271.
- Commentary on Cratylus
  - Proclus (2007). Proclus' Commentary on Plato's Cratylus. London. ISBN 9781472558190.
- Commentary on Plato's "Timaeus"
  - Taylor, Thomas (1820). The Commentaries of Proclus on the Timaeus of Plato in Five Books; containing a treasury of Pythagoric and Platonic physiology. Translated from the Greek by Thomas Taylor. London.
  - Proclus: Commentary on Plato's Timaeus. Volume 1. Book 1: Proclus on the Socratic State and Atlantis. Cambridge: Cambridge University Press. 2007. ISBN 9780511482656.
- Commentary on Plato's "Parmenides"
  - Proclus (1992). Proclus' Commentary on Plato's Parmenides (1st Princeton pbk. print. with corrections, 1992 ed.). Princeton, N.J.: Princeton University Press. ISBN 0691020892.
- Commentary on Plato's "Republic"
- A Commentary on the First Book of Euclid's "Elements"
  - Proclus (1970). A Commentary on the First Book of Euclid's Elements. Princeton, N.J.: Princeton University Press. ISBN 9780691020907.
- Elements of Physics
- Three small works: Ten Problems Concerning Providence; On Providence and Fate; On the Existence of Evils
  - Proclus On Providence (in English and Ancient Greek). Translated by Steel, Carlos. London; New York: Bloomsbury Academic. 2007. ISBN 9781472501479.
  - Proclus Ten Problems Concerning Providence (in English and Ancient Greek). Translated by Opsomer, Jan; Steel, Carlos. London; New Delhi; New York; Sydney: Bloomsbury. 2012. ISBN 9781472501783.
  - Proclus On the Existence of Evils (in English, Ancient Greek, and Latin). Translated by Opsomer, Jan; Steel, Carlos. London; New York: Bloomsbury. 2014 [2003]. ISBN 9781472501035.
- On the Eternity of the World, De Aeternitate Mundi, Proclus (in English and Ancient Greek). Translated by Lang, Helen S.; Macro, A. D.; McGinnis, Jon. Berkeley; Los Angeles; London: University of California Press. 2001. ISBN 0520225546.
- Various Hymns
  - Berg, R.M. van den (2001). Mansfeld, J.; Runia, D.T; Van Winden, J. C. M. (eds.). Proclus' Hymns. Philosophia Antiqua, A Series of Studies on Ancient Philosophy (in English and Ancient Greek). Vol. 90. Translated by Berg, R.M. van den. Leiden, Boston, Köln: Koninklijke Brill NV, Leiden, The Netherlands. ISBN 9004122362.
- Commentary on the Chaldaean Oracles (fragments)
  - Proclus the Successor on Poetics and the Homeric Poems (in English and Ancient Greek). Translated by Lamberton, Robert. Atlanta, Georgia, USA: Society of Biblical Literature. 2012. ISBN 9781589837119.
- Fragments of lost works
  - Taylor, Thomas (1825). The Fragments that Remain of the Lost Writings of Proclus. Printed for the author, and sold by Black, Young, and Young.
  - Pachoumi, Eleni (2024). On the hieratic art according to the Greeks (Περὶ τῆς καθ’ Ἕλληνας ἱερατικῆς τέχνης).

The Liber de Causis (Book of Causes) is not a work by Proclus, but a summary of his work the Elements of Theology, likely written by an Arabic interpreter.

- Calma, Dragos (2021). Reading Proclus and the Book of Causes. Volume 2, Translations and Acculturations. Leiden. ISBN 9789004440685.

== See also ==
- Allegorical interpretations of Plato

== Notes ==
=== References ===
- Chlup, Radek (2016). Proclus: an introduction. Cambridge University Press. ISBN 978-1-316-62885-0.
- Chisholm, Hugh, ed. (1911). "Proclus" . Encyclopædia Britannica. Vol. 22 (11th ed.). Cambridge University Press. p. 418.
- Dodds, E. R. (1992). The Elements of Theology: A Revised Text with Translation, Introduction, and Commentary. Oxford University Press UK.
- Gow, James (1884). A Short History of Greek Mathematics. Cambridge University press.
- Heath (1908). "Proclus and His Sources". The Thirteen Books of Euclid's Elements Vol. 1. p. 29. "It is well known that the commentary of Proclus on Eucl. Book I is one of the two main sources of information as to the history of Greek geometry which we possess, the other being the Collection of Pappus"
- Helmig, Christoph; Steel, Carlos (2011). "Proclus". In Zalta, Edward N. (ed.). Stanford Encyclopedia of Philosophy. ISSN 1095-5054. OCLC 429049174.
- Fernández Fernández, Á. (2026). Review. BMCR.
- Helmig, Christoph; Steel, Carlos (2020). "Bibliography: Proclus' Complete Works (extant, lost, and spurious)". In Zalta, Edward N. (ed.). Stanford Encyclopedia of Philosophy. ISSN 1095-5054. OCLC 429049174.
