= Troy (surname) =

The surname Troy is anglicised from the following surnames:

- The Gaelic-Irish surnames
  - Ó Tréamháin (Meaning unknown - possibly descendant of journals)
  - Ó Troighthigh (Descendant of foot-soldier)
  - Ó Toráin (Meaning unknown - possibly descendant of turrets)
- The Anglo-Norman (or French) toponymic surname
  - de Troyes (from Troyes, France)
  - de Troye (from Mitchell Troy, Wales)

== People ==
Arts and entertainment

- Dermot Troy (1927–1962), Irish singer
- Doris Troy (1937–2004), American R&B singer
- Étienne Troy (1844-1909), French baritone opera singer
- Hagen Troy, Singaporean-born composing artist
- Hugh Troy (1906–1964), American painter
- John Troy (hurler) (born 1971), Offaly GAA hurler and all-star
- Judy Troy (born 1951), American university professor, short story writer and novelist
- Leroy Troy (born 1966), American banjo player
- Louise Troy (1933–1994), American stage and screen actress
- Pastor Troy (Micah LeVar Troy, born 1977), American rapper, actor, and record producer
- William Troy (educator) (1903–1961), American essayist, teacher and film critic

History and current affairs

- William Troy (Medal of Honor) (1848–1907), US Navy sailor awarded the Medal of Honor

Politics and law

- Dan Troy (born 1948), Ohio, United States, politician
- John Troy (Australian politician) (born 1941), doctor and member of the Western Australian Legislative Assembly, 1977–1980
- John Weir Troy (1868–1942), American Democratic politician, Governor of Alaska Territory, 1933–1939
- Leo Troy, Canadian politician
- Frank Troy (1877–1953), Australian politician
- Paddy Troy (1908–1978), Australian trade unionist and communist activist
- Robert Troy, Irish politician
- Tevi Troy (born 1967), official in administration of U.S. President George W. Bush, adviser to presidential candidate Mitt Romney

Religion

- Bertie Troy (1931–2007), Roman Catholic priest and All-Ireland Hurling Final winning manager
- E. F. Troy (c. 1855 – 1910), Catholic philanthropist and stained glass artist in Australia
- John Troy (bishop) (1739–1823), Roman Catholic Archbishop of Dublin

Science and academics

- Elizabeth Mary Troy (1914–2011), Irish obstetrician

Sports

- "Bun" Troy (1888–1918), German-American major league baseball pitcher
- "Dasher" Troy (1856–1938), American major league baseball player
- Gregg Troy (born 1950), American college and Olympic swimming coach
- Jack Troy (1927–1995), Australian rugby league footballer
- Jim Troy (hurling) (born 1960), retired Irish hurling player
- Jim Troy (ice hockey) (born 1953), American former professional ice hockey player
- Mike Troy (1940–2019), American swimmer

== People with non-anglicised versions ==
de Troyes

- Chrétien de Troyes (1160–1191), French poet and trouvère known for his writing on Arthurian subjects
- Richard de Troye (fl. 1247–1262), was a Norman Knight and landowner in County Kilkenny, Ireland.
- Theobald de Troye (fl. 1317), was a Norman Knight and landowner in County Kilkenny, Ireland. Quite likely a descendant of Richard De Troye as they held the same land and paid knights fees in County Kilkenny.
- Guillaume de Troyes (fl. 1357), was a royal falconer during the reign of King Edward III.
- John de Troye (died 1371), a Welsh-born Crown official and judge in fourteenth century Ireland, who held the offices of Chancellor of the Exchequer of Ireland and Lord Treasurer of Ireland.
- François de Troy (1645–1730), French painter and engraver
- Jean François de Troy (1679–1752), French painter and tapestry designer
- Edward Troye (1808–1874), Swiss-born American painter
- Pierre de Troyes (died 1868), a captain that led the French capture of Moose Factory, Rupert House, and Fort Albany in Hudson Bay 1686.
- Olivia Troye (born 1977), American former government official and vice president of strategy, policy, and plans at the National Insurance Crime Bureau
- Raymond Troye (1908–2003), Belgian officer and writer

Ó Troighthigh

- Aicher Ua Traighthech (died 1002/1003), soldier of Corcomroe in the medieval period and mentioned in the Irish Annals.
- Domhnall Albanach Ó Troighthigh (fl. 1482), was an Irish scribe and physician.

== Fictional characters ==
- Christian Troy, a fictional character played by Julian McMahon on the FX Networks series Nip/Tuck
- Donna Troy, a superheroine appearing in DC Comics

== Place names originating from the Troy (or variant) surname ==
- Ballytrehy / Baile Uí Throithigh (The town of Ó Troithigh), a region in Clogheen, County Tipperary, Ireland.
- Ballynatray / Baile Uí Throithigh (The town of Ó Troithigh), a region in Coshbride, County Waterford, Ireland.
- Castletroy / Caladh an Treoigh (O' Troy's Landing), a suburb of Limerick, County Limerick, Ireland.
- Troy's Gate / Geata an Treoigh (Gate of O' Troy's), an historical gate within the town of Kilkenny, County Kilkenny, Ireland.
- Troyes, a commune and the capital of the department of Aube in the Grand Est region of north-central France.
- Troyswood / Coill an Treoigh (Wood of O' Troy's), a region of County Kilkenny, Ireland.
- Troyswood Castle, a castle ruins in Troyswood, County Kilkenny, Ireland.
- Mitchell Troy / Llanfihangel Troddi (Church of St Michael on the River Trothy) a village and community in Monmouthshire, south east Wales.

== See also ==
- Irish medical families
- Ó Troighthigh
- Troy (disambiguation)
