= Peirce Ó Caiside =

Irish physician and writer

Peirce Ó Caiside (died 1504) was a Gaelic-Irish physician and writer. He was of the most well-known Ó Caiside family, who were natives of what is now County Fermanagh, where they were poets, churchmen, scholars and hereditary physicians to the Maguire Kings of Fer Manach. The Annals of Ulster, sub anno 1504, state:

- O'Caiside of Cuil died this year: namely, Pierce, son of Thomas O'Caiside; to wit, the medical ollam of Mag Uidhir and a recognised master in literature and in physic, in theory and in practice and a man that kept a general guest-house for everyone. And he died of the King's Game.

== See also ==
- Irish medical families
