= Finghin Ó Caiside =

Finghin Ó Caiside, Gaelic-Irish physician, died 1322.

Ó Caiside was a member of a brehon family based in County Fermanagh, who became physicians to its kings. An earlier member of the family was the 12th-century poet and cleric, Gilla Mo Dutu Úa Caiside.

The Annals of the Four Masters, sub anno 1322, record Finghin's death:

- Fineen O'Cassidy, Chief Physician of Fermanagh, died.

== See also ==
- Irish medical families
