= Gilla na nAingel Ó Caiside =

Gilla na nAingel Ó Caiside, Gaelic-Irish physician, died 1335.

Ó Caiside was one of the earliest recorded members of a brehon family who became hereditary physicians for the Kings of Fer Manach. The Annals of the Four Masters, sub anno 1335, record of him:

- Gilla-na-n-Angel O'Cassidy, Chief Physician of Fermanagh, died.

One of his recorded descendants was Tadhg Ó Caiside, who died 1450.
