= Tadhg Ó Caiside =

Gaelic-Irish physician (died 1450)

Tadhg Ó Caiside (d. 1450), was a Gaelic-Irish physician and Chief of the Name.

Ó Caiside was a member of a brehon family based in what is now County Fermanagh. His great-great grandfather was Gilla na nAingel Ó Caiside (died 1335), and may in turn have been a descendant of the 12th-century poet, Gilla Mo Dutu Úa Caiside.

The Annals of Ulster record Tadhg's death, sub anno 1450:

- Ua Caiside of Cuil, namely, Tadhg, son of Joseph, son of Tadhg Mor, son of Gilla-na-naingel Ua Caiside, died this year: to wit, the chief physician of the Fir-Manach, and so on.

== See also ==
- Irish medical families
