= Carine Van Regenmortel =

Carine Van Regenmortel (born 1960 in Antwerp, Belgium) is a Belgian corporate lawyer at the Belgian law firm ALTIUS where she heads the corporate departement. She served as ALTIUS' managing partner from 2007 till March 2016. She was elected "Managing Partner of the Year 2010" at the Belgian Legal Awards, and the following year, ALTIUS was elected "Corporate Firm of the Year” at the Belgian Legal Awards.

Regenmortel received a Lic.Jur. degree from the University of Antwerp in 1983, and an LLM in European Law from the College of Europe in Bruges, where she studied 1983-1984 (Jean Rey Promotion). She attended the European Young Lawyers Scheme, organised by the British Council in 1988.
