= Concobur Ó Caiside =

Gaelic-Irish physician (died 1502)

Concobur Ó Caiside, Gaelic-Irish physician, died 1502.

Ó Caiside was a member of a brehon family based in what is now County Fermanagh. According to the Annals of Ulster, sub anno 1502:

"Incursion was made by the son of John Mag Mathgamna the Tawny and by the sons of Edmund Mag Uidhir on the sons of Flaithbertach Mag Uidhir, whereby they were pillaged, except a little, and wherein was taken Brian the Scarred, son of Flaithbertach and he bruised. And Toirdelbach, son of Flaithbertach, was left for dead and Concobur, son of Tadhg O'Caiside, (namely, an eminent physician) was seriously wounded and died of it."

His father, Tadhg Ó Caiside, died in 1450.
