= Military funerals in the United States =

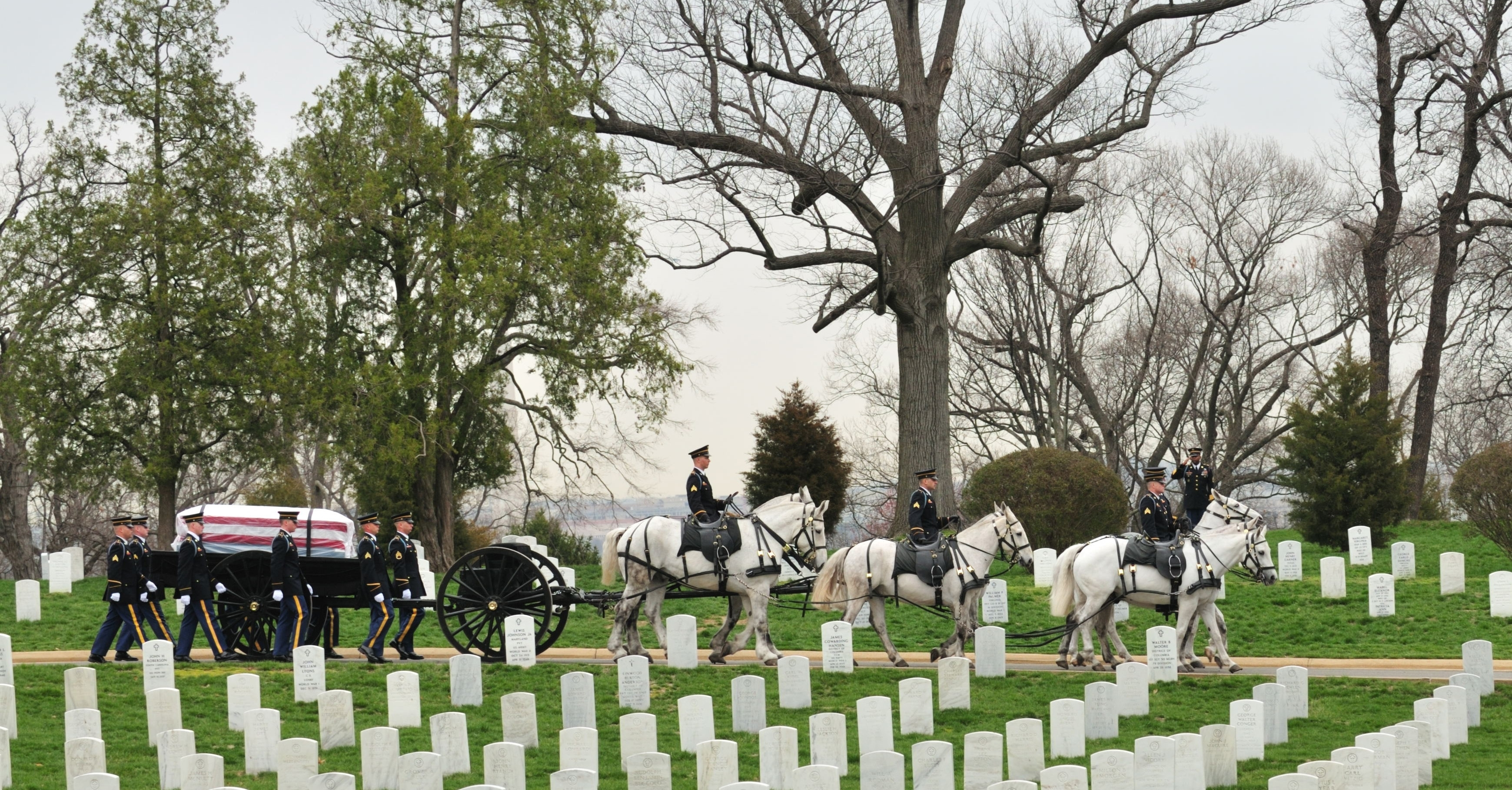
The United States Army Caisson Platoon of the 3rd United States Infantry Regiment "The Old Guard" transports the flag-draped casket of Sergeant Major of the Army George W. Dunaway on a horse-drawn limbers and caissons during a military funeral procession at Arlington National Cemetery, 2008.

A military funeral in the United States is a memorial or burial rite conducted by the United States Armed Forces for a Soldier, Marine, Sailor, Airman, Guardian or Coast Guardsman who died in battle, a veteran, or other prominent military figures or a president. A military funeral may feature guards of honor, the firing of volley shots as a salute, drumming and other military elements, with the flag of the United States draping over the coffin.

In the United States, the United States Army Military District of Washington (MDW) is responsible for providing military funerals. "Honoring Those Who Served" is the title of the program for instituting a dignified military funeral with full honors to the nation's veterans.

As of January 1, 2000, Section 578 of Public Law 106-65 of the National Defense Authorization Act mandates that the United States Armed Forces shall provide the rendering of honors in a military funeral for any eligible veteran if requested by his or her family. As mandated by federal law, an honor guard detail for the burial of an eligible veteran shall consist of no fewer than two members of the Armed Forces. One member of the detail shall be a representative of the parent armed service of the deceased veteran. The honor guard detail will, at a minimum, perform a ceremony that includes the folding and presenting of the U.S. flag to the next of kin and the sounding of Taps which will be played by a lone bugler, if available, or by audio recording. Today, there are so few buglers available that the United States Armed Forces often cannot provide one. However, federal law allows Reserve and National Guard units to assist with funeral honors duty when necessary.

== Eligibility ==
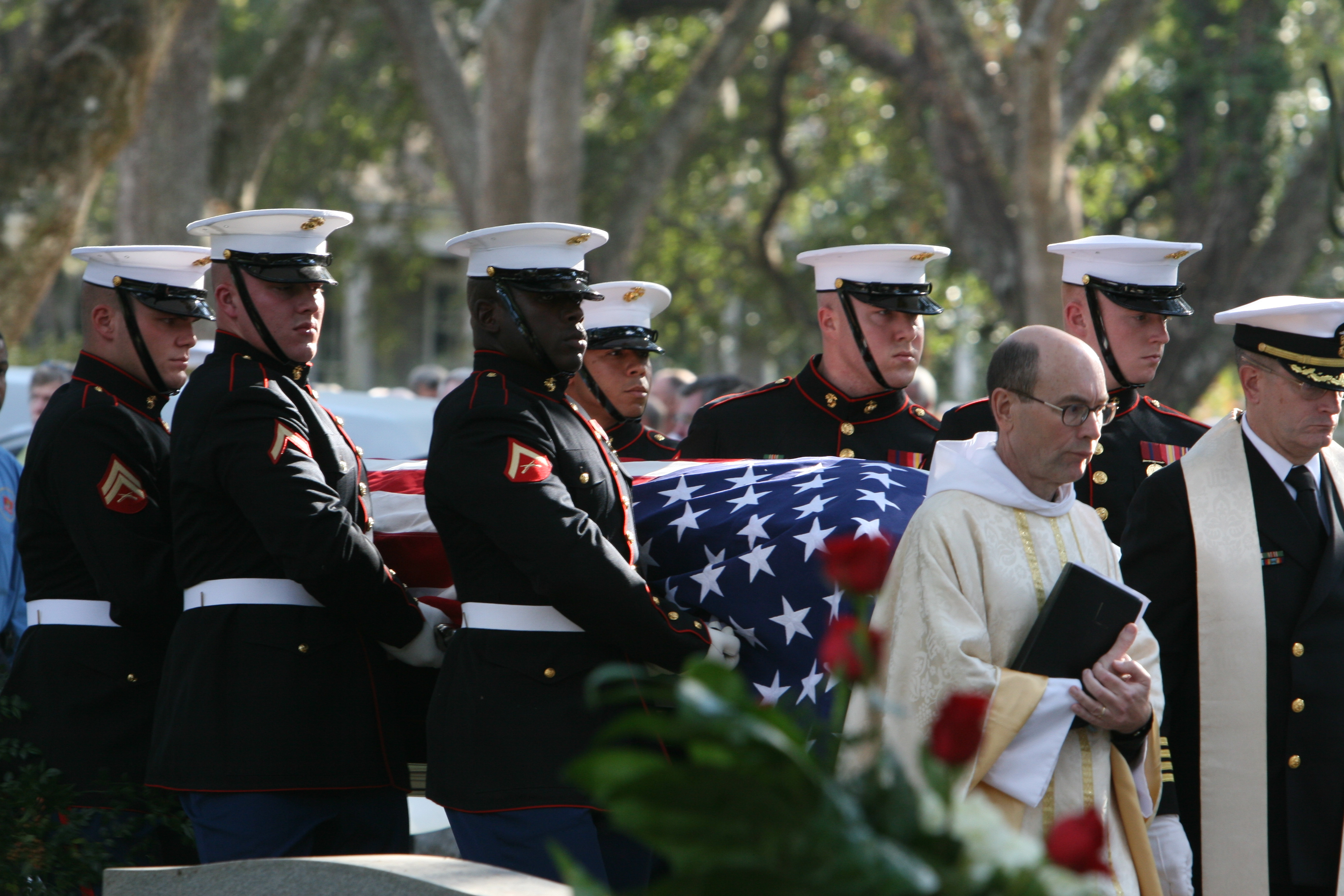
A military chaplain seen leading honor guards derived from the United States Marine Corps as they carry the casket of General Robert H. Barrow to the place of burial.

Generally, federal law allows for military funeral honors for all veterans who were discharged under circumstances "other than dishonorable". Funeral directors will require the veteran's DD Form 214 to establish eligibility.

Those who are eligible for military funerals and full honors in the United States include the following:

- Active duty or Selected Reserve in the United States Armed Forces.
- Former active duty or Selected Reserve who departed under conditions other than dishonorable in the United States Armed Forces.
- Former enlisted servicemen or servicewomen who completed at least one term or period of initial obligated service in the Selected Reserve and departed under conditions other than dishonorable.
- Former servicemen or servicewomen who were discharged due to a disability incurred or aggravated in the line of duty.

== Ceremony ==
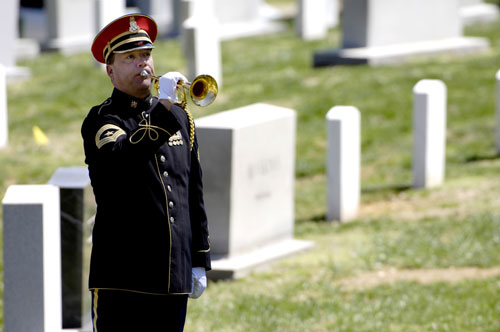
A bugler sounds Taps during the funeral of former United States Secretary of Defense Caspar W. Weinberger in Arlington National Cemetery, 2006.

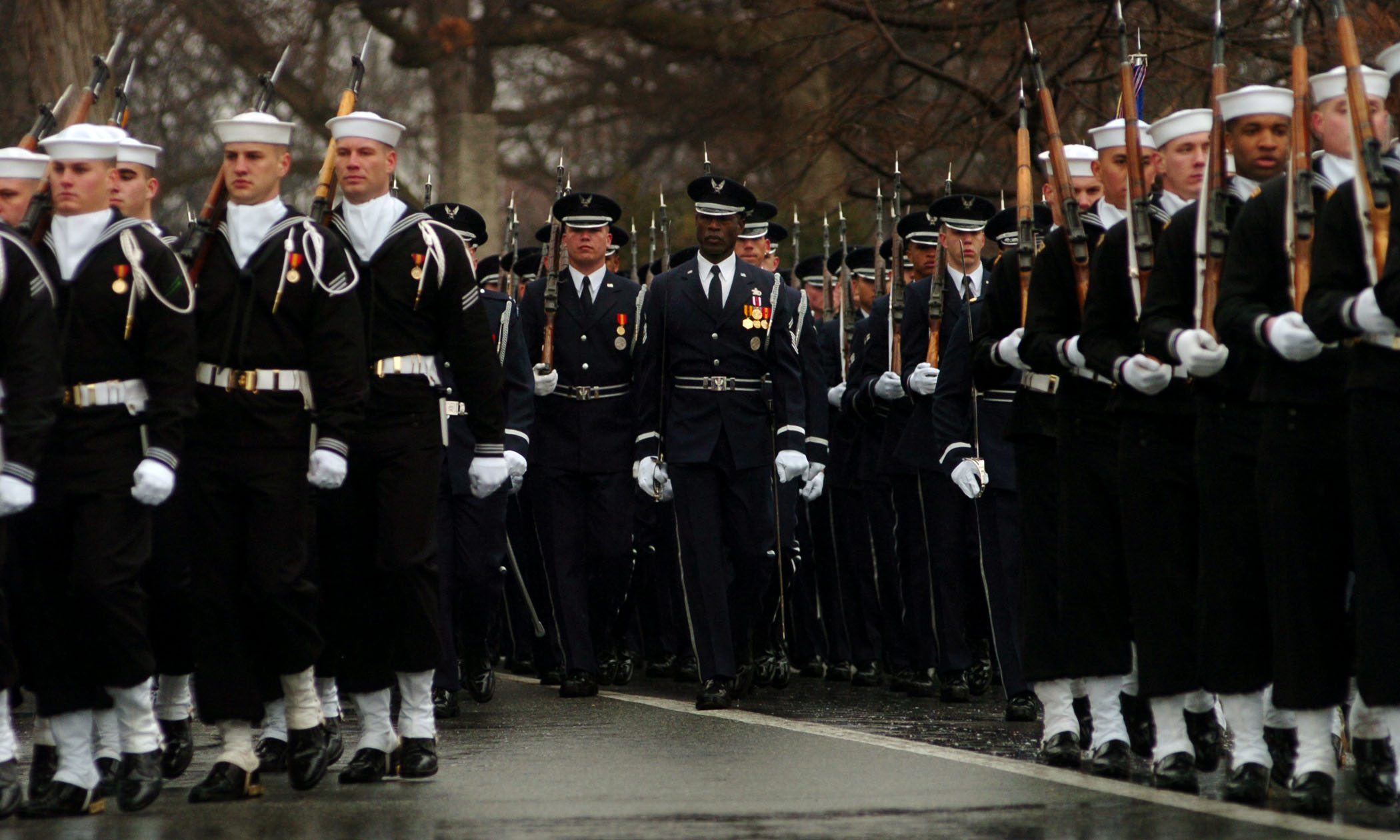
Escort platoons marching during the military funeral of Admiral Thomas Hinman Moorer in Arlington National Cemetery, 2004.

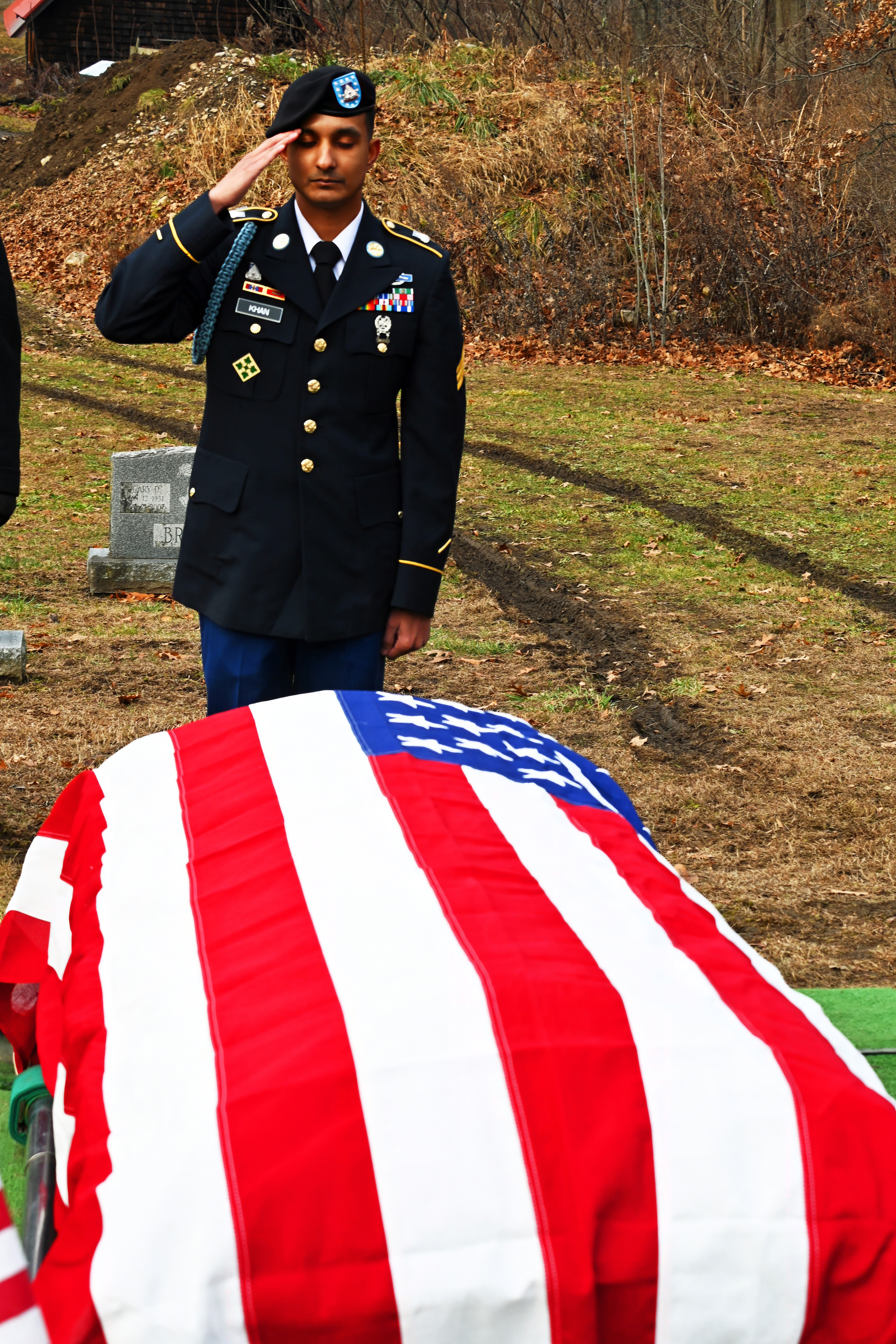
Final salute

In the United States, there are several types of military funerals such as those performed at Arlington National Cemetery, which include and omit certain components depending on the status of the deceased (active, retired, veteran, rank/occupation).

Standard honor military funerals include the following:

- A military chaplain for family members.
- A casket draped in the flag of the United States and as a pall.
- A casket team serving as honor guards in a ceremonial role over the remains and as pallbearers.
- For funerals for an enlisted non-commissioned officer of E-9 rank and officers, the casket is transported via a horse-drawn limbers and caissons. For all other funerals, the casket is transported using a hearse.
- Fighter jets in missing man formation by the United States Air Force may perform an aerial flyover.
- The formation of a rifle party consisting of an odd number of service members, between three and seven, will fire a three-volley salute (size varies according to the rank of the deceased).
- The sounding of Taps is performed by a lone bugler or an audio recording, at a distance 30 to 50 yards from the grave site while a "Final Salute" is given (in specific cases with the United States Military Academy, a muffled drum roll might accompany the bugler).

Full honor military funerals include all standard honors in addition to the following:

- For funerals of commanding officers of O-6 (Colonel/Captain) and above, a caparisoned, riderless horse or motorcycle, symbolizing a fallen leader, will follow the limbers and caissons.
- For funerals of general officers and flag officers of O-10 (four-star rank), a 17-gun salute is fired; O-9 (three-star rank), a 15-gun salute is fired; O-8 (two-star rank), a 13-gun salute is fired; O-7 (one-star rank), an 11-gun salute is fired.
- A military band and an escort platoon participate (size varies according to the rank of the deceased).

Armed forces military funerals include all standard and full honors in addition to the following:

- Escort platoons from all six branches of the United States Armed Forces participate.
- These funerals are reserved for the President of the United States (as commander-in-chief), the Secretary of Defense, the Chairman of the Joint Chiefs of Staff, and officers granted multiple-service command.
- For funerals of presidents, a 21-gun salute using artillery and battery pieces is fired (not to be confused with a three-volley salute), while all other high state officials receive 19-gun salutes.

When a spouse or other dependent of a current or former member of the United States Armed Forces is buried, the military service in which the primary party served will provide a casket team and a chaplain. No other military honors will be rendered unless the spouse served in the military.

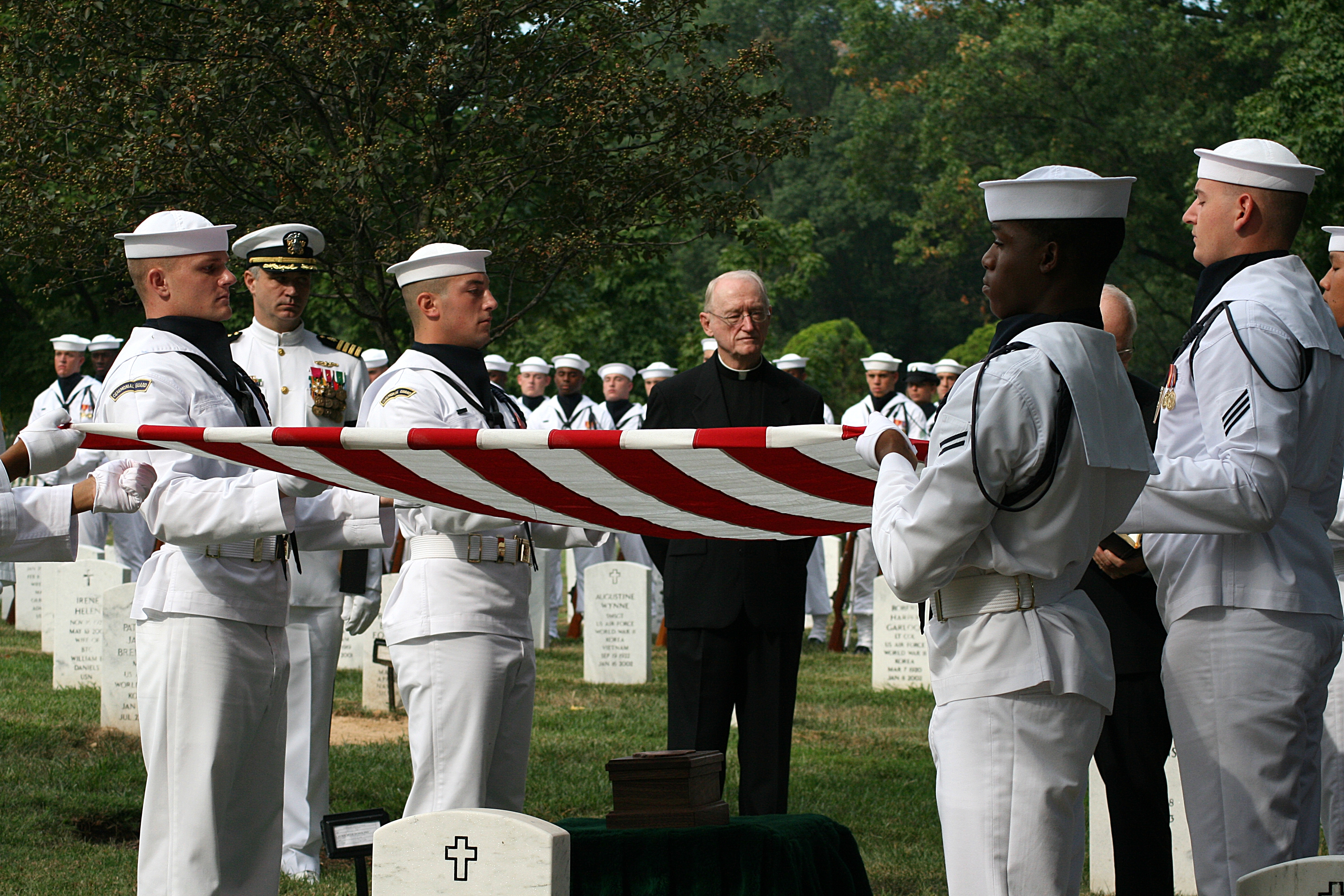
Sailors from the United States Navy fold the flag of the United States during a military funeral at Arlington National Cemetery for Captain Laurie Mosolino, a former United States Navy Medical Corps surgeon.

Sequence for folding the flag of the United States

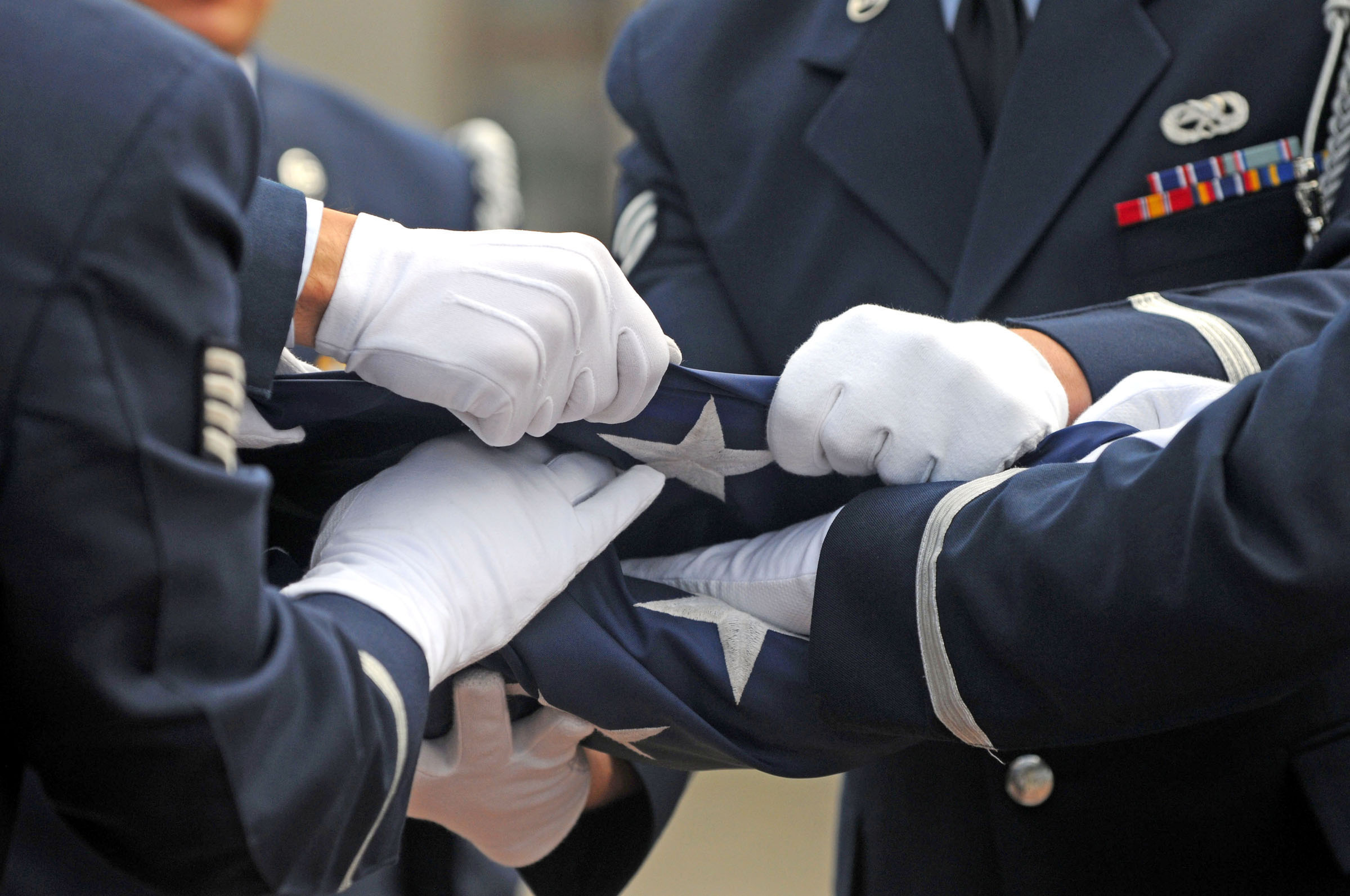
Members of the 86th Airlift Wing honor guard conduct a flag-folding ceremony at Ramstein Air Base, Germany, 2009.

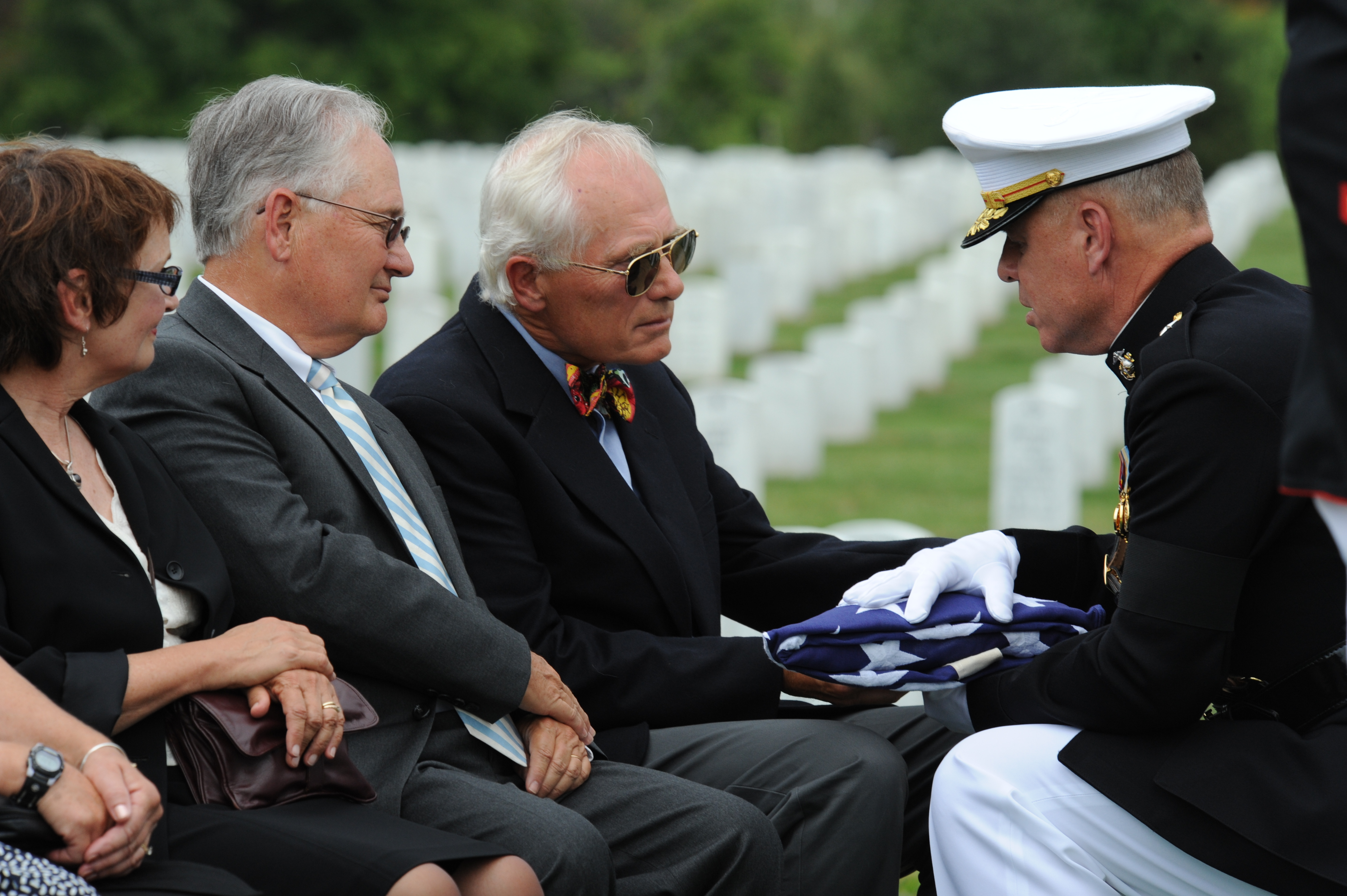
Inspector General of the Marine Corps Brigadier General Kenneth J. Lee presents a folded flag to Laurence E. Pope, the eldest son of Medal of Honor recipient Major Everett Pope during the burial service for Major Pope held at Arlington National Cemetery on September 15, 2009.

The flag of the United States draped over the casket is meticulously folded thirteen times by a total of six honor guards, three on each side of the casket. When the flag is completely folded, the stars point upwards, which remind Americans of their national motto, In God We Trust. After the flag is completely folded and tucked in, it takes on the appearance of a tricorne hat, reminding Americans of the soldiers who served under General George Washington, and the sailors and Marines who served under Captain John Paul Jones, who were followed by their comrades and shipmates in the United States Armed Forces.

An honor guard composed of one or more branches of the United States Armed Forces, presents the flag to the next of kin. The presenter, a member of the same service as the deceased, will lean forward while presenting the folded flag, with the straight edge of the flag facing the recipient. The presenter then recites the following wording, which was standardized on April 20, 2012:

On behalf of the President of the United States, the United States (Army, Marine Corps, Navy, Air Force, Space Force or Coast Guard), and a grateful nation, please accept this flag as a symbol of our appreciation for your loved one's honorable and faithful service.

Three spent shell-casings, each representing one of three volleys, were sometimes slipped into the folds of the flag before its presentation to the next of kin. The intention was to convey that the presence of the shell-casings proved that a rifle volley had taken place in connection with the member's funeral. However, this practice has become infrequent and is rarely seen today as Title 4, Section 8(h) of the United States Code specifies that the flag should not be used as a receptacle for holding anything.

== Ramp ceremonies ==
A "ramp ceremony" is a memorial ceremony, not an actual funeral, for a soldier killed in a war zone held at an airfield near or in a location where an airplane is waiting nearby to take the deceased's remains to his or her home country. The term has been in use since at least 2003 and became common during the wars in Iraq and Afghanistan.

== Gallery ==
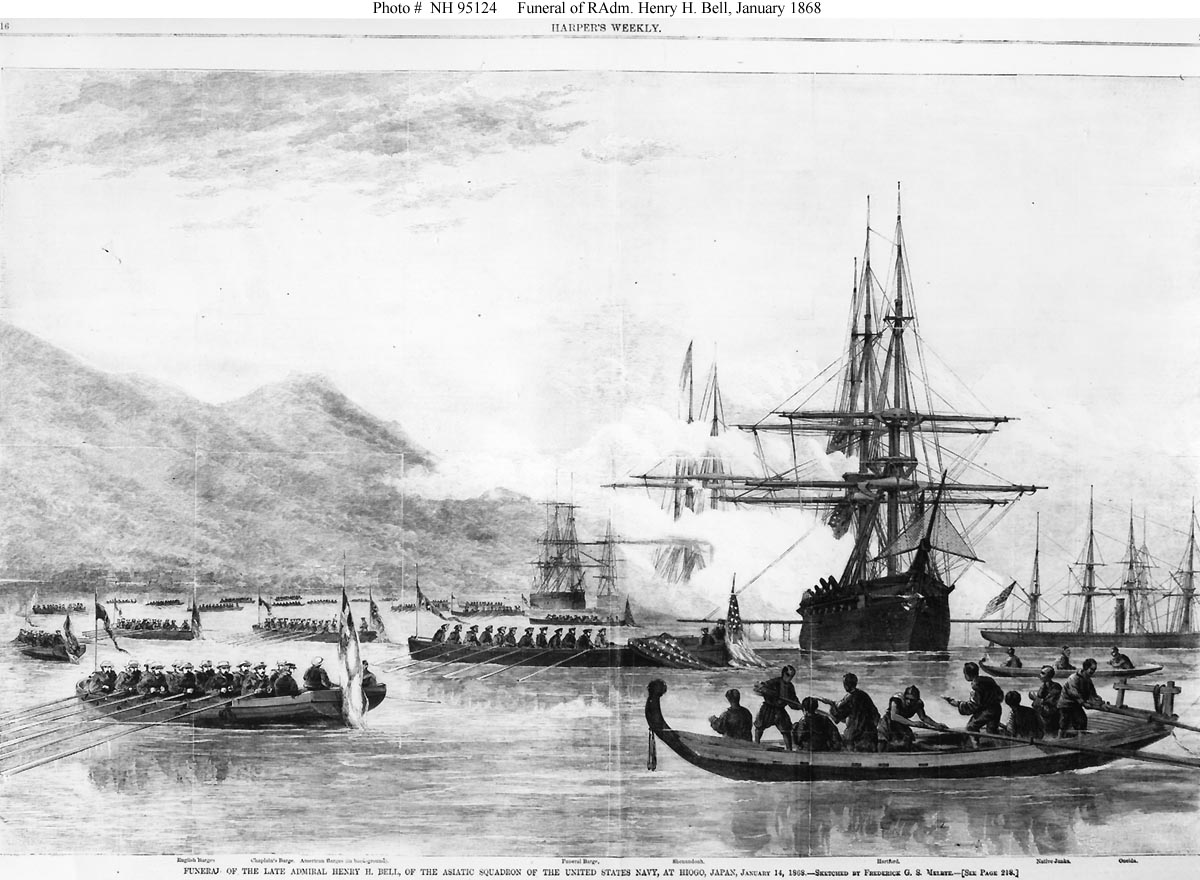
The military funeral of U.S. Navy Rear Admiral Henry H. Bell held in Hiogo, Japan on January 14, 1868.

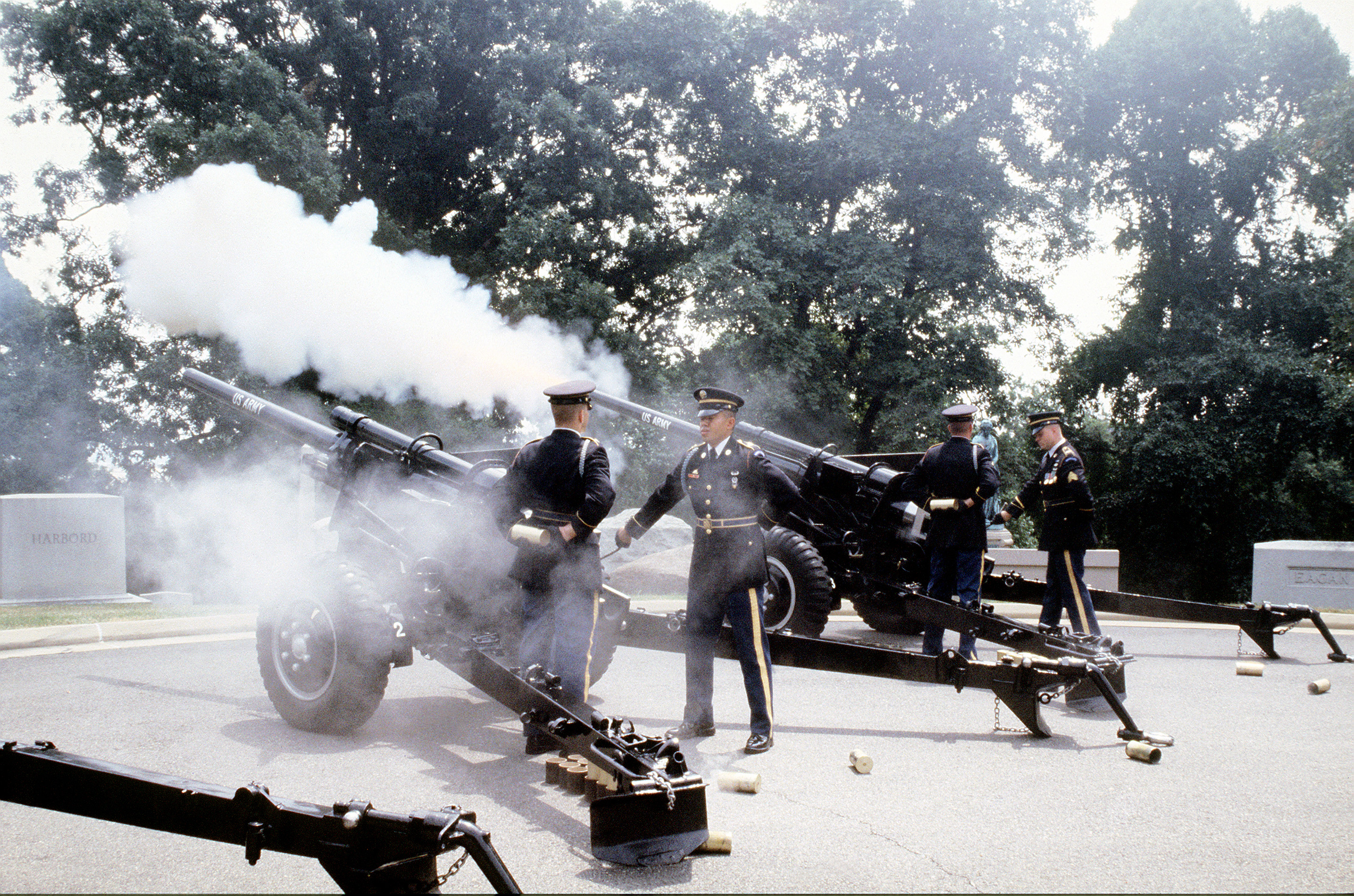
Members of the Presidential Salute Guns Battery, 3rd Infantry Regiment, render a gun salute with 3" anti-tank guns during a military funeral at Arlington National Cemetery on August 10, 1998.

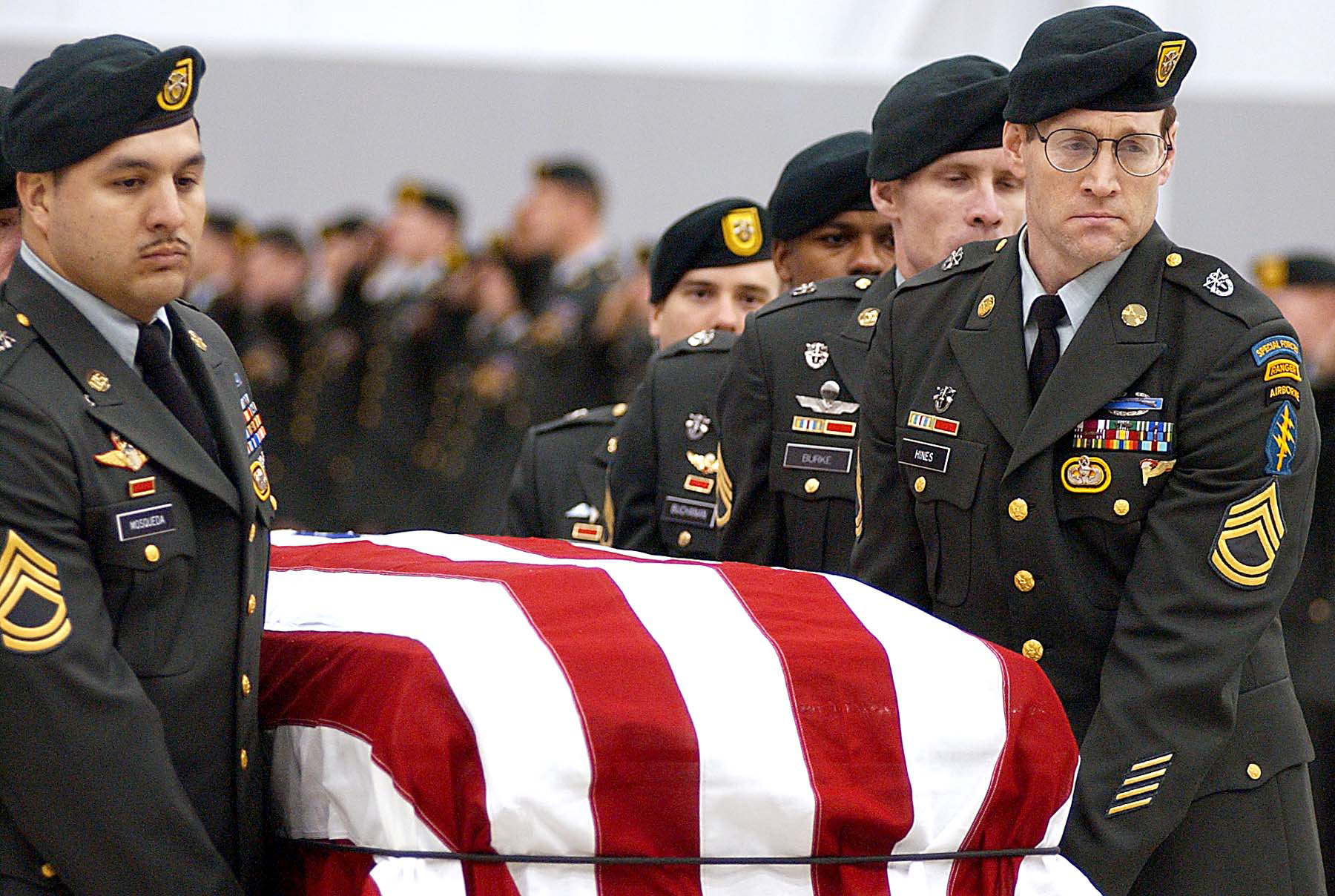
A casket team from the 1st Special Forces Group carries the flag-draped casket of Sergeant First Class Nathan Chapman on January 8, 2002.

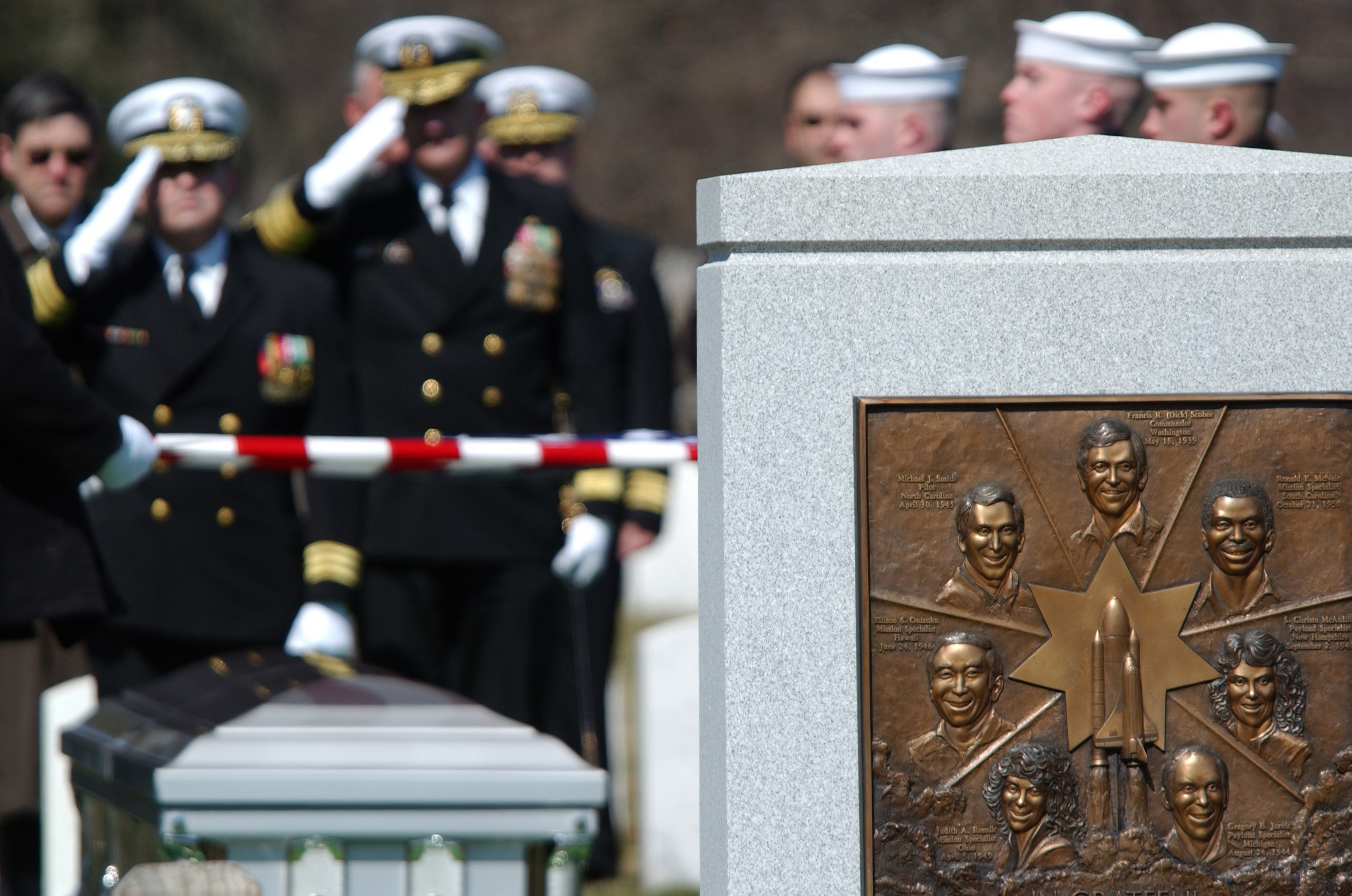
A casket team from the United States Navy folds the flag covering the casket of NASA astronaut and U.S. Navy Captain Laurel Blair Salton Clark, who died in the Space Shuttle Columbia disaster in 2003.

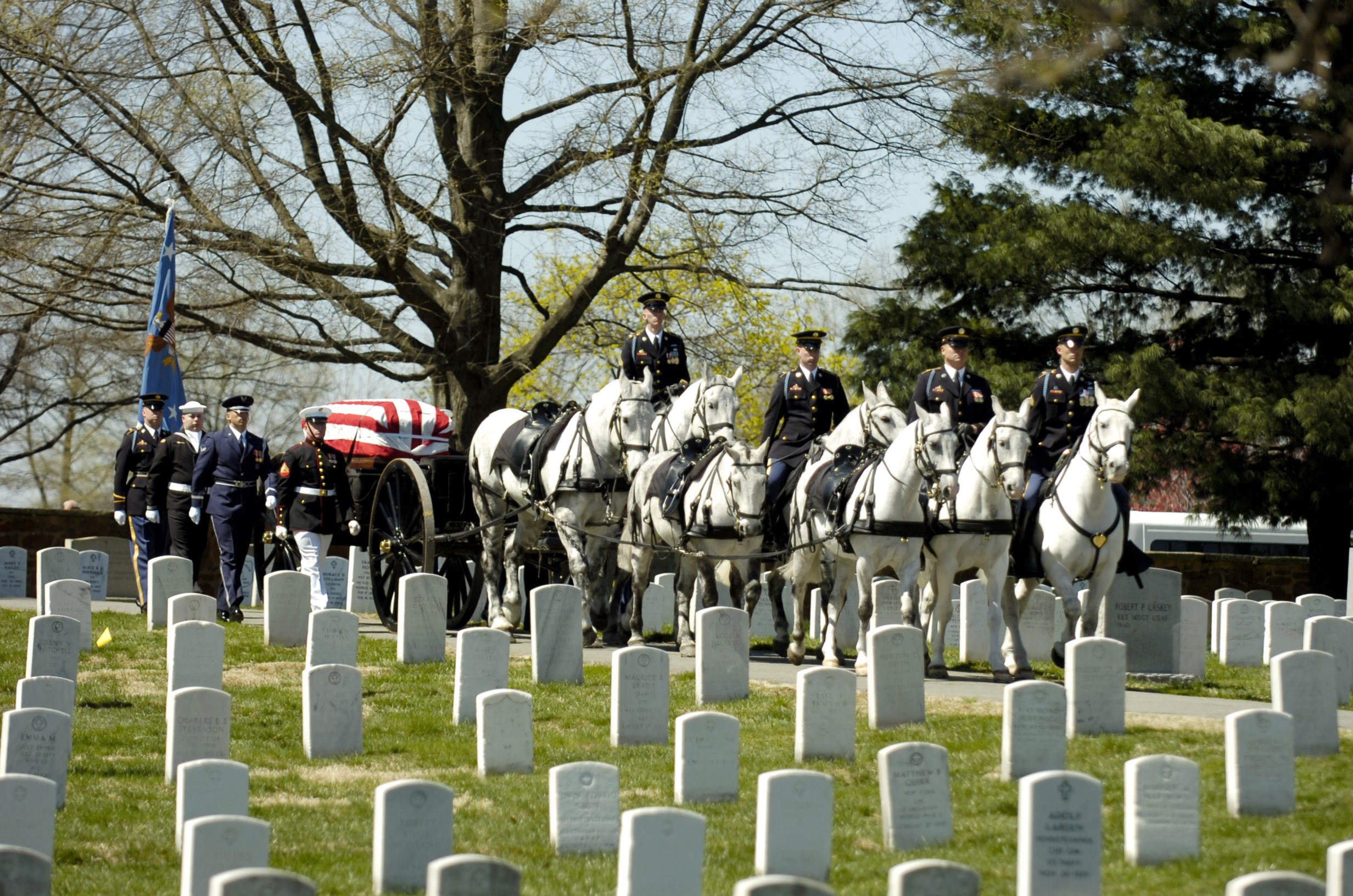
The casket of Caspar Weinberger, 15th United States Secretary of Defense, in a ceremonial funeral procession en route to Arlington National Cemetery on April 4, 2006.

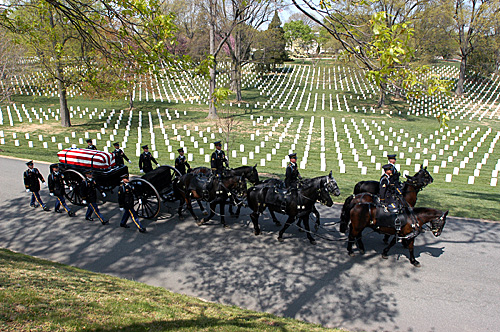
A casket team from the 3rd Infantry Regiment transports the remains of Retired Chief Warrant Officer Michael J. Novosel during a funeral procession at Arlington National Cemetery on April 13, 2006.

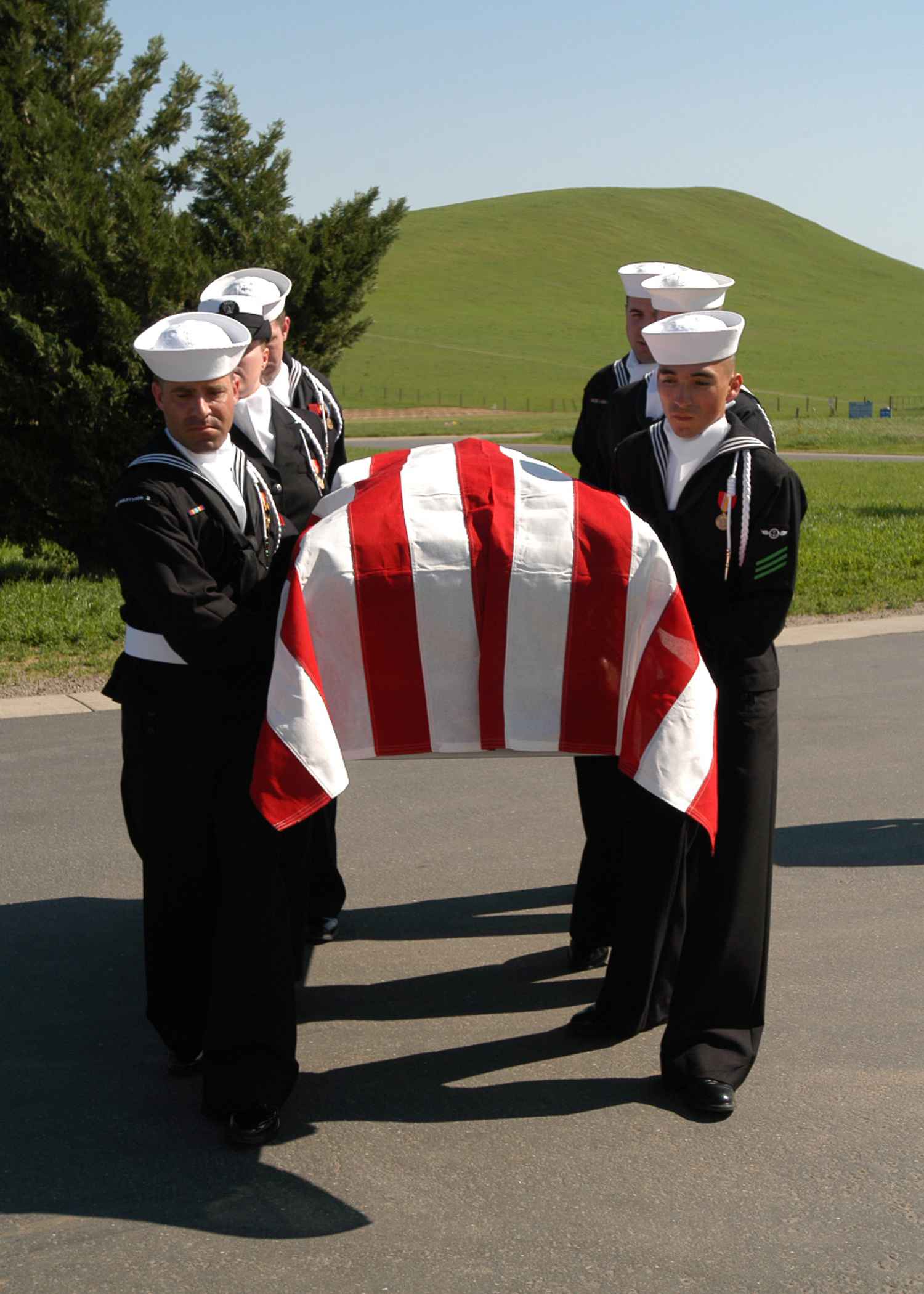
The Ceremonial Unit assigned to Naval Air Station Lemoore rendering honors at a military funeral at San Joaquin Valley National Cemetery in Gustine, California.

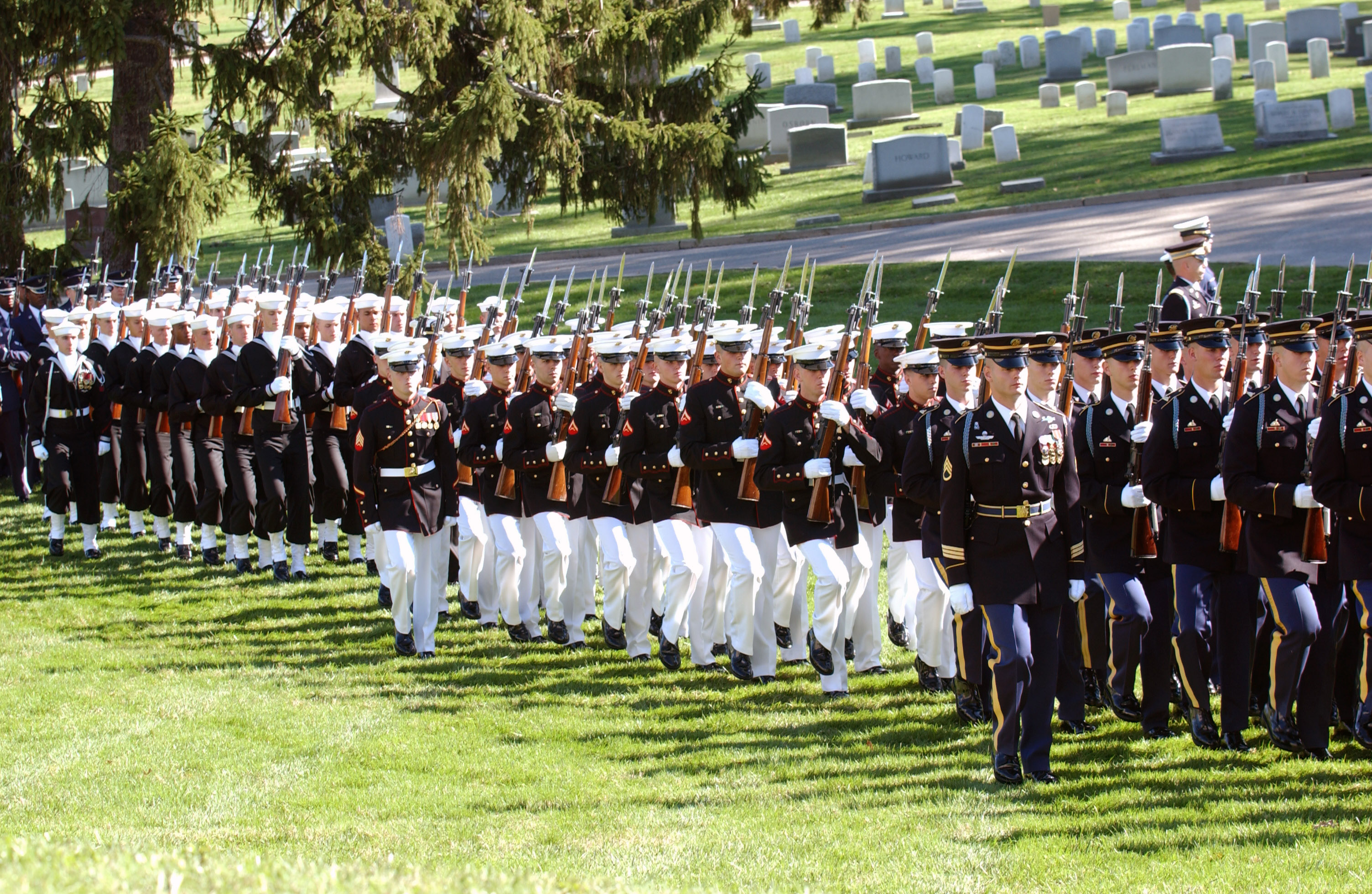
Escort platoons march in the United States Naval Academy Cemetery as part of the funeral procession for former Chairman of the Joint Chiefs of Staff, Admiral William J. Crowe in 2007.

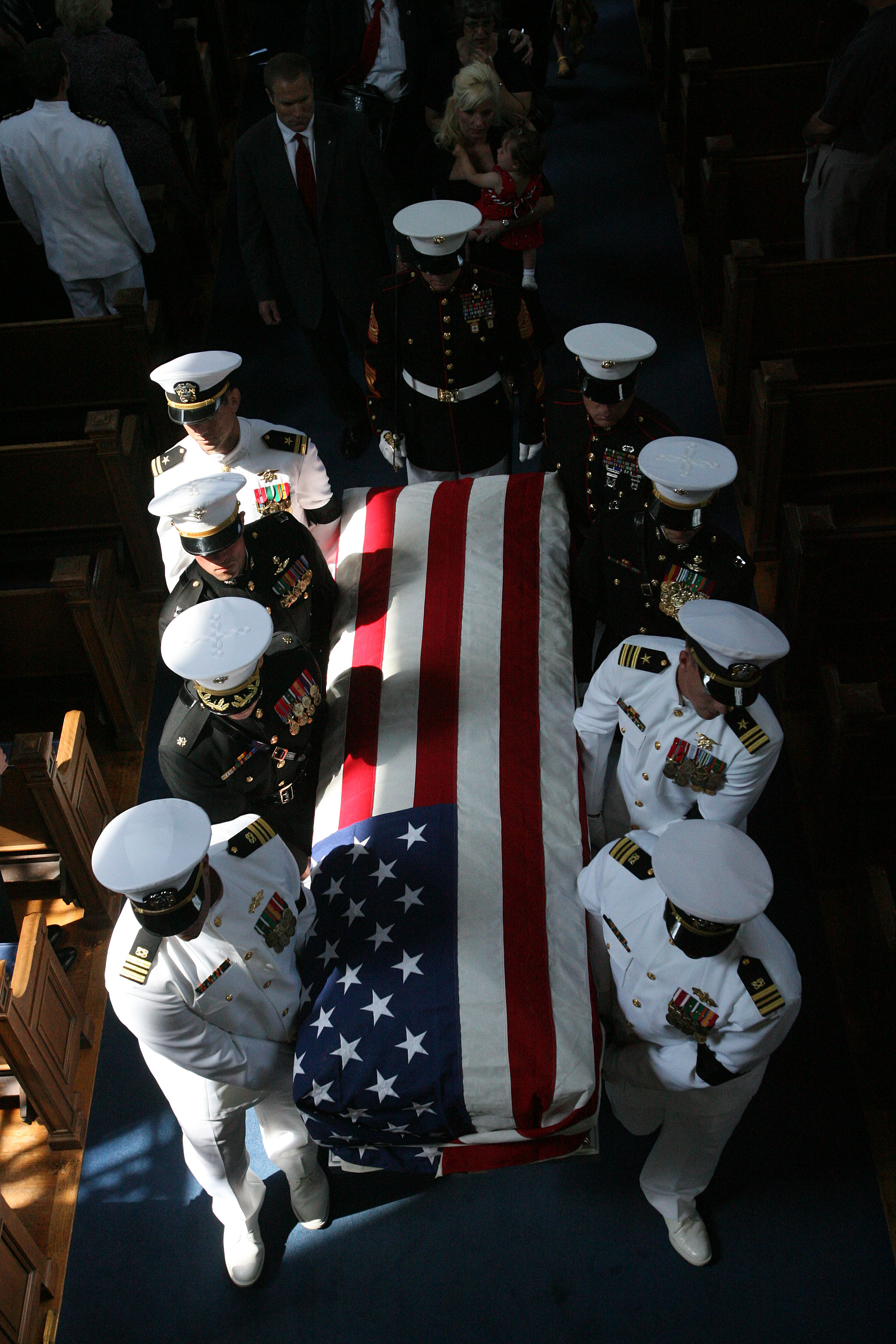
A casket team carries Major Douglas A. Zembiec, former commander of E Company, 2nd Battalion, 1st Marine Regiment from the Naval Academy Chapel in Annapolis, Maryland following the funeral service.

== See also ==
- State funerals in the United States
- Military funeral
- United States flag code
