= Neilan =

Neilan is a surname of Irish origin. Notable people with the surname include:

- Paul Neilan, American novelist
- Marshall Neilan, American actor, director, producer, and screenwriter
- Paddy Neilan, Gaelic football referee
- Martin Neilan, Irish politician

== See also ==
- Alison Neilans, English suffragette
- Nealon
