= Jean Rey (politician) =

Belgian politician (1902–1983)

His Excellency Jean Rey
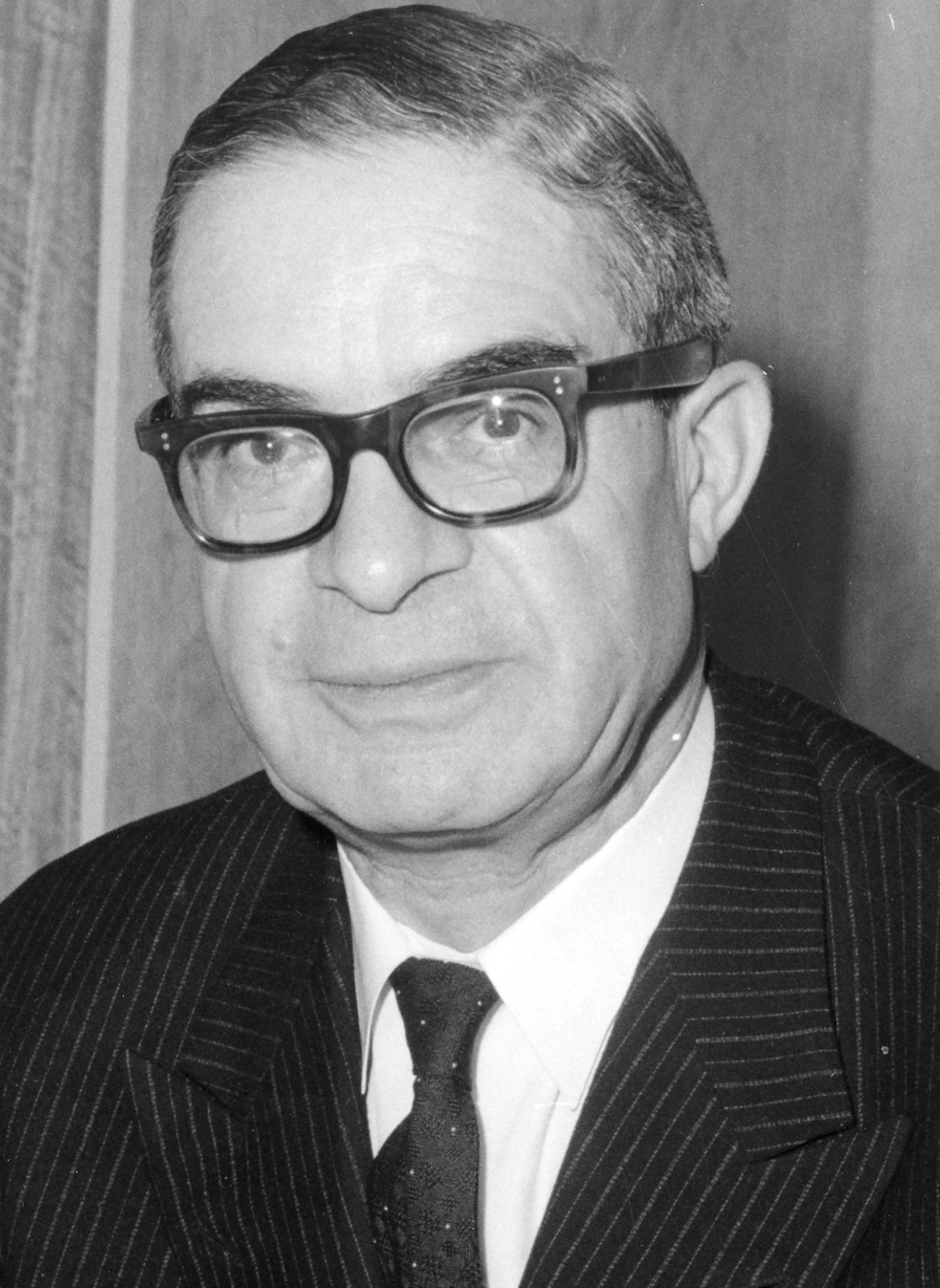
- Rey in 1966

President of the European Commission
- In office 2 July 1967 – 30 June 1970
- Vice President: Sicco Mansholt
- Preceded by: Walter Hallstein
- Succeeded by: Franco Maria Malfatti

European Commissioner for External Relations
- In office 7 January 1958 – 2 July 1967
- President: Walter Hallstein
- Preceded by: Position established
- Succeeded by: Edoardo Martino

Personal details
- Born: Jean Max Georges Rey; 15 July 1902 Liège, Belgium
- Died: 19 May 1983 (aged 80) Liège, Belgium
- Resting place: Brussels Cemetery, Evere, Brussels, Belgium
- Party: Liberal Reformist Party (1971–)
- Other political affiliations: Party for Freedom and Progress (Before 1971)
- Education: University of Liège

Jean Rey (French: [ʒɑ̃ ʁɛ]; 15 July 1902 – 19 May 1983) was a Belgian Liberal politician who served as the second president of the European Commission from 1967 to 1970. He served as European Commissioner for External Relations from 1958 to 1967. The 1983–1984 academic year at the College of Europe was named in his honour.

== Early life ==
Born in Liège into a Protestant family, Jean Rey studied law at the University of Liège, where he obtained a PhD in 1926. He began his career as a barrister at the Court of Appeal in Liège. His commitment to the Walloon Movement drew him into politics. He joined the Liberal Party and was elected city councillor of Liège in 1935. In 1939, he won a seat in the Belgian Chamber of Representatives.

In the wake of World War II, he was one of the most vocal opponents of the "policy of independence" (neutrality) supported by successive Belgian governments and King Leopold III. He was mobilised as a reserve officer in 1940 and served during the Battle of Belgium. He was captured by the Germans and spent the rest of the conflict as a prisoner of war, being interned in Oflag XD near Fischbeck, where he was a member of the clandestine Masonic Lodge L'Obstinée.

== Career after World War II ==
After the war, he advocated for the federalisation of Belgium. As early as 1947 he promoted, together with five other members of Parliament (among whom Julien Lahaut), a bill on the organisation of a federal state. If passed, the new Constitution would have transformed Belgium into a Confederation consisting of two States, Flanders and Wallonia, and the federal region of Brussels. However, a majority in the Belgian Parliament refused to take the proposal into consideration.

Rey was Minister of Reconstruction from 1949 until 1950, and Minister of Economy from 1954 until 1958. As such, he was involved both in the early development of the European Coal and Steel Community and in the negotiations that led to the creation of the European Economic Community (EEC) and the European Atomic Energy Community (EAEC).

Member of the commission (Hallstein Commission) of the CEE from 1958 until 1967, responsible for external relations, he played an important role in the negotiations of the Kennedy Round (1964–1967).

In 1967, he succeeded Walter Hallstein as President of the European Commission (he was the first President of the Commission of the merged CSCE, CEE and EAEC). Still a convinced federalist, he undertook to reinforce the Community institutions. He won increased powers for the European Parliament and advocated its election by universal suffrage. During his presidency, he oversaw the completion of the customs union (1968).

He also played an important role in the Summit of The Hague in 1969, where the European leaders decided to relaunch European integration with two new initiatives: on the one hand, Economic and Monetary Union of the European Union (EMU), and on the other hand, European Political Cooperation (EPC), which foreshadow the euro and the Common Foreign and Security Policy of the European Union today. It was also at The Hague that France gave up its resistance against the accession of the United Kingdom to the EEC.

Finally, in 1970, the last year of this mandate, Rey won the European governments' support for his proposal to give the Community "own resources". This meant that the EEC no longer depended exclusively on contributions by the member states, but could complete these with revenues from customs duties, and levies on agricultural products from outside the Community, in addition to a share of the VAT revenue.

From 1964 until 1974, Rey was chairman of the board of the College of Europe in Bruges. He presided over the European Movement from 1974 to 1978 and was a member of the Jean Monnet Foundation for Europe. In 1979, he became a member of the first European Parliament elected by universal suffrage.

Jean Rey also remained active in Belgian politics. He became the éminence grise of the French-speaking liberals who broke away from the unitary Party for Freedom and Progress to form the Parti Réformateur et Libéral Wallon (PRLW) in 1976.

Jean Rey died in his native city Liège. In the European Quarter of Brussels, there is now a square named after him. A street in the 15e arrondissement of Paris also bears his name.

== Sources ==
- Jean Rey (EU)
- Address given by Jean Rey on the merger of the executive bodies (Strasbourg, 20 September 1967)

Political offices
| New office | Belgian European Commissioner; 1958–1970; Served alongside: Albert Coppé | Succeeded by Albert Coppé |
| New office | European Commissioner for External Relations; 1958–1967 | Succeeded by Edoardo Martino |
| Preceded by Walter Hallstein | President of the European Commission; 1967–1970 | Succeeded by Franco Maria Malfatti |
Academic offices
| Preceded by Albert II of Belgium | Convocation Speaker for the College of Europe; 1970 | Succeeded by Altiero Spinelli |
