= An Giolla Glas Ó Caiside =

An Giolla Glas Ó Caiside (fl. 1515–27) was a Gaelic-Irish physician and scribe.

Ó Caiside was a member of a brehon family based in County Fermanagh, In the second and third decades of the 16th century, he compiled a manuscript containing "scientific commentary on a wide range of topics including medicine, philosophy, astronomy and botany." Such manuscripts would have created for the use of the family and their colleges, often copied by physicians in other parts of Ireland. A number, such as Liber Flavus Fergusiorum, became family heirlooms over the centuries. Ó Caiside's manuscript still exists and is stored in the library of Corpus Christi College, Oxford.
