= Regimen sanitatis Salernitanum =

Medieval didactic poem on medical practices

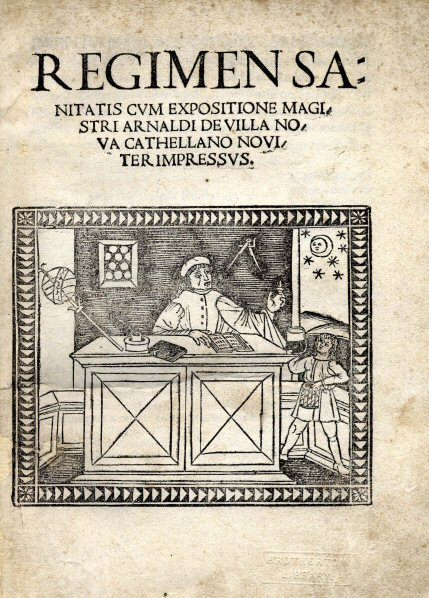
First edition title page (1480). The title reads: Regimen sanitatis cum expositione magistri Arnaldi de Villanova Cathellano noviter impressus. Venetiis: impressum per Bernardinum Venetum de Vitalibus, 1480.

Regimen sanitatis Salernitanum, Latin: The Salernitan Rule of Health (commonly known as Flos medicinae or Lilium medicinae - The Flower of Medicine, The Lily of Medicine), full title: Regimen sanitatis cum expositione magistri Arnaldi de Villanova Cathellano noviter impressus, is a medieval didactic poem in hexameter verse. It is allegedly a work of the Schola Medica Salernitana (from which its other name Flos medicinae scholae Salerni is derived), a medieval medical school in Salerno. This school founded in the 9th century is considered possibly the oldest medical school, in a southern Italian city, which held the most important medical information, the most famous and notable being Regimen santiatis Salernitanum. Nearly 300 copies of this poem are published, in various languages, for medical professionals.

== Origin ==
The Regimen is believed to have been written in the 12th or 13th century, although some sources place it as early as 1050. Although the work bears the name of the famous medieval medical school, it is not certain if it originated there. Some legends claim the poem was written for the benefit of the Duke of Normandy Robert Curthose, while others claim it was a gift from the Saliternitan writers to the king of England. The true author is unknown, but it is sometimes attributed to John of Milan.

== Content ==
This poem concerns domestic medical practice such as daily hygienic procedures and diet (e.g. it illustrates the therapeutic uses of wine). The Regimen contains multiple outlets of guidance and instruction for preservation of public and individual health. There is also mention of therapeutics. This poem is written with the focus of the public, specifically in the wordage that can be understood by lay people, rather than a focus towards medical professionals. The poem discusses dietetics, which is a branch of medicine that include environmental factors of health. The early Regimen was organized by the six non-naturals. According to Galen, they are: air, food and drink, sleeping and waking, motion and rest, excretions and retentions, and dreams and the passions of the soul. The original content addressed the Humors, the Complexions (Temperaments), and some diseases. This poem concerns domestic medical practice such as daily hygienic procedures and diet (e.g. it illustrates the therapeutic uses of wine). In medieval medicine at this time, there was also the four "humours" that were related to both the body and the four elements, those being; phelgm (water), blood (air), yellow bile (fire) and black bile (earth). The original content addressed the Humors, the Complexions (Temperaments), and some diseases. It also contained a phlebotomy, which provided information on bloodletting. The Regimen focuses on the non-natural things as measures for diseases, some of which include migraines, strokes, dizziness, and with the segment of therapeutics provides treatment based on natural remedies. The index of subjects of the Code of Health for the School of Salerno, which is derived of the poem, begins with the individual health based on sleep, portioning of foods, wine, diets, and seasoning of food to pertain to certain health benefits. The Health Code then goes into individual foods, such as fruits and fish and dairy products, and then introduces topics such as bones, teeth and veins of the body, medications, hygiene and the Regimen of months. Translations of the Code Book show that the Regimen shows unparallel value at its time of existence to the school of medicine because of its general knowledge to all aspects of individual and public health that other books or instructors did not include in their works.

Subsequent Reception

From the late 15th century, the original Latin poem was often printed with a commentary attributed to Arnold of Villanova. However, historians such as René Verrier have argued that the commentary was added in the 1470s by an anonymous Belgian physician, and later mistakenly associated with Arnold as the Regimen was often published alongside the authentically Arnaldian text Regimen Sanitatis ad Regem Aragonum. The Regimen was contemporary with Secretum Secretorum, a health manual written by pseudo-Aristotle. However, the Regimen was more popular because the rhyming verses were easier to remember. The Regimen was translated into vernacular languages, including Irish, Bohemian, Occitan, Hebrew, German, Anglo-Norman, and Italian. Following its first appearance in print, the Regimen was translated into almost every European language, and the book achieved tremendous popularity and nearly forty different editions were produced before 1501. An English translation by Thomas Paynell was printed by Thomas Berthelet in 1528.

The work itself came to be highly revered as a scholarly medical text and was seriously discussed until the 19th century. Various editions and versions of the Regimen circulated throughout Europe, many with commentaries that added or removed material from the original poem. During this interval, the Regimen was expanded from the original 364 lines to 3,526 hexameter verses. The first English translation was made by Sir John Harington in 1608. An attempt to make a medically accurate translation was made in 1871 by the American doctor John Ordronaux.

By 1224, the Holy Roman Emperor Frederick II made it required that any student wishing to practice and learn Medicine in the Naples Kingdom had to gain approval from the Salerno medical masters, which also helped to preserve the printed version of the poem's verses, as they became a requirement to Southern Italian students and subjects.

== Quotes ==
- Why should a man die who has sage in his garden? (Latin: Cur moriatur homo, cui salvia crescit in horto?). Cf. Contra vim mortis non crescit herba in hortis.

Si tibi deficiant medici, medici tibi fiant
Haec tria: mens laeta, requies, moderata diaeta (Latin text).

Use three physicions still; first Doctor Quiet,
Next Doctor Merry-man and Doctor Dyet (Harington's translation, 1608).

If doctors fail you, let these three be doctors for you:
A joyful mind, rest, and a moderate diet. (Modern translation)

== See also ==
- Domhnall Albanach Ó Troighthigh
- Breviarium de signis, causis et curis morborum
