= L'Obstinée =

L'Obstinée was a Masonic Lodge founded in the German prisoner-of-war camp Oflag XD during World War II. Together with the Lodges Liberté chérie and "Les frères captifs d'Allach", it was one of the very few lodges founded within a Nazi concentration or POW camp.

== The Lodge ==
The Masonic Lodge L'Obstinée was founded by members of the Grand Orient of Belgium. Jean Rey, who would become President of the European Commission (Rey Commission), was orator of the lodge. The Grand Orient of Belgium would recognize the Lodge on 14 July 1946.

== Sources ==
- Van liberalisme en antiklerikalisme naar militante vrijzinnigheid - De oorlogstijd (in Dutch)
- Le Judenlager des Mazures (in French)
