= De Troyes =

de Troyes is an Anglo-Norman (or French) toponymic surname which originated in Troyes, France and Mitchell Troy, Wales.

Notable people utilising the de Troyes surname or a variant include:

- Chrétien de Troyes (1160–1191), French poet and trouvère known for his writing on Arthurian subjects
- John de Troye (died 1371), Welsh-born Crown official and judge in fourteenth century Ireland, who held the offices of Chancellor of the Exchequer of Ireland and Lord Treasurer of Ireland
- François de Troy (1645–1730), French painter and engraver
- Jean François de Troy (1679–1752), French painter and tapestry designer
- Edward Troye (1808–1874), Swiss-born American painter
- Pierre de Troyes (died 1868), French army captain who fought in Canada
- Olivia Troye (born 1977), American former government official and vice president of strategy, policy, and plans at the National Insurance Crime Bureau
- Raymond Troye (1908–2003), Belgian army officer and writer

Notable people with the given name include:

- Troye Sivan (born 1995), Australian actor, YouTuber and singer

== See also ==
- Troyes, town in France
