= Thomas Berthelet =

Thomas Berthelet (died 1555) was a London printer, probably from France. His surname was also variously spelt Berthelot and Berthelett. Berthelet was to become King's Printer and King's Bookbinder for Henry VIII. His name was Englished as "Bartlett".

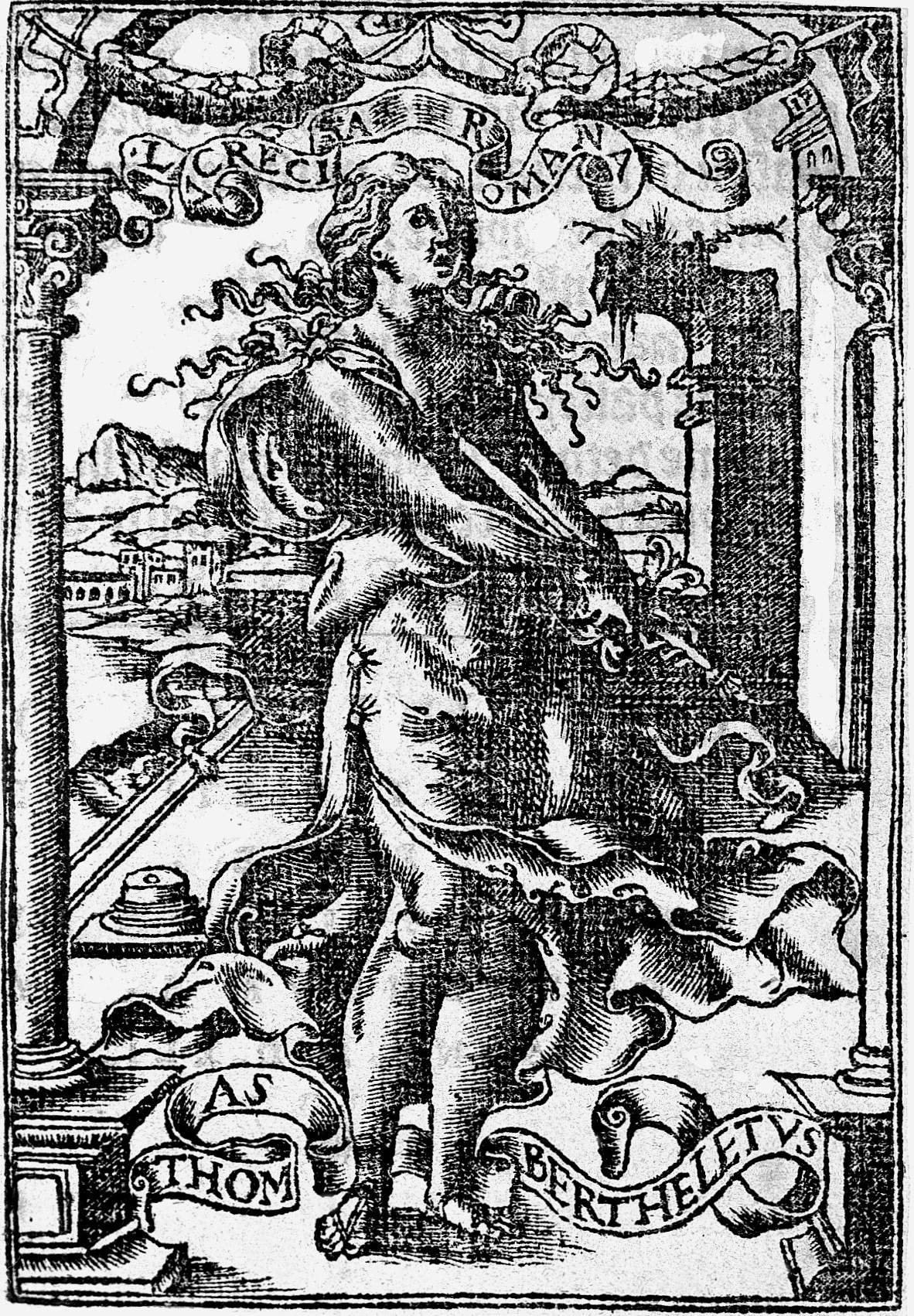
Thomas Berthelet's device

== Background ==
Berthelet was of French descent though very little is known about his background before he established himself as a printer in London. He is thought to have been apprenticed to London printer Pynson, and some historians have suggested he may have been known as Thomas Bercula previously.

== Career ==
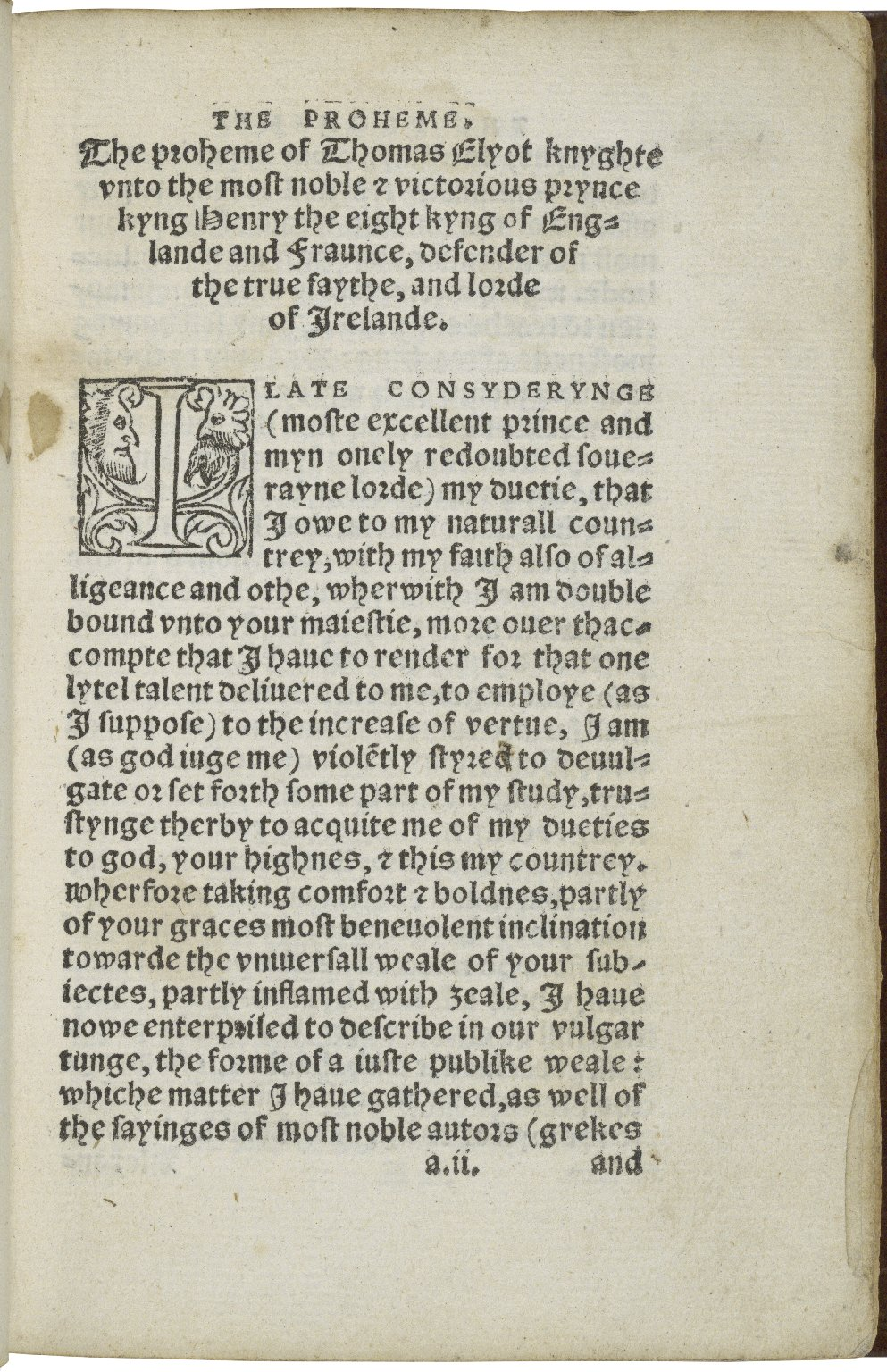
The proem of The boke named the Gouernour, deuysed by syr Thomas Elyot knight; printed by Thomas Berthelet, 1537

Berthelet is recorded, in an application for a marriage licence of 23 August 1524, as being resident in the London parish of St Dunstan in London's famous printing quarter, Fleet Street. He was a member of the Stationers' Company.

On 27 September 1524 Berthelet printed his first book Opus sane de deorum dearumque gentilium genealogia, a small tract by the monk Galfredus Petrus of Bayeux, which was printed in his premises in Fleet Street. In 1528 he printed a translation by Thomas Paynell of the Regimen sanitatis Salerni. This became one of the most popular medical books of the time.

By 22 February 1530, Berthelet held the office of King's Printer under Henry VIII. As holder of that post he received an annuity of £4. Berthelet remained in the position until Henry's death. As holder, he printed the king's statutes and proclamations, and also such important works as The Bishops' Book and The King's Book. Henry died in 1547, after which time Berthelet relinquished the post (succeeded by Richard Grafton), and he was granted a coat of arms in 1549.

Berthelet printed many Humanist texts important to his age. Among them are the English Bible of Richard Taverner; the original works and translations of Sir Thomas Elyot; Thomas Lupset's Counsels of Saint Isidore of Seville, his Treatise of Charity, his Sermon of St Chrysostom, his Exhortation to Young Men, his Treatise on the Art of Dying well, and his edition of Dr Colet's sermon delivered at the convocation at St Paul's; Sir Thomas Chaloner's translation of The Praise of Folly by Erasmus, and several other works of Erasmus translated by Thomas Paynell.

In 1545 he was appointed by the Common Council to a committee for poor-relief in the city, together with Humfrey Pakington, Stephen Kirton, Augustine Hynde, William Garrard, Thomas Bacon and others, assisting the Lord Mayor and four aldermen in the work of receiving the Hospitals (dissolved religious houses) from the King and devising ordinances for their future management. In 1548, with regard to St Bartholomew's Hospital, in view of their painstaking work on the orders and constitutions, and their especial diligence, they (including Berthelet) were reappointed for one further year to continue their governance of the refounded institution.

== Private life ==
Berthelet died in London on 26 September 1555. He was succeeded by his second wife, Margaret, and two sons. Berthelet's funeral was held before 26 January 1556 and the mourners included priests, clerks and fellow craftsmen from the book trades.

Historiated initials owned by Thomas Berthelet
