= Ó Troighthigh =

Ó Troighthigh (in English: Troy; O'Trohy, Trehy) is a Gaelic-Irish surname, meaning descendant of foot-soldier.

== Naming conventions ==
Male	Daughter	Wife (Long)	House
Ó Troighthigh	Ní Troighthigh	Bean Uí Troighthigh	Uí Troighthigh

== History ==
The Uí Troighthigh were associated with the Kingdom of Corco Modhruadh, an area that was coextensive with the diocese of Kilfenora. The earliest mention of the family occurs circa 1002/1003, within the Irish Annals. Specifically the Annals of the Four Masters (M), The Annals of Ulster (U) and Annals of Inisfallen (AI).

M 1002.10 Conchobhar, son of Maelseachlainn, lord of Corca-Modhruadh; and Aicher Ua Traighthech, with many others, were slain by the men of Umhall.

U 1003.3 Cellach son of Diarmait, king of Osraige, Aed ua Con Fhiachla, king of Tethba, Conchobor son, of Mael Sechnaill, king of Corcu Modruad, and Aicher na Traighthech were killed.

AI 1003.3 The slaying of Conchobar son of Mael Sechnaill, king of Corcu Modruad, and of Amlaíb, son of Lochlainn, and of Aicher Ua Traigthech in the west of Connachta; and Cathal, son of Labraid, was killed by the sons of Donnchadh Finn.

The Uí Troighthigh became a hereditary medical family where bearers of the name were in successive generations physicians to the clans of the Dál gCais, as well as other premier families of Munster and Leinster. Branches of the family were located in what is now County Clare, County Limerick and County Tipperary, as well as elsewhere in Munster, and Leinster. While they originated in County Clare with Aicher Ua Traigthech, a large contingent settled within Clogheen district of County Tipperary and their association with the region perpetuated in the place-name Ballytrehy (Baile Uí Throithigh, or the town of Ó Troithigh). Doctors in the Uí Troighthigh family were known for their study of medicine and translated many Latin and Greek medical textbooks over the centuries. In 1477 Domhnall Albanach Ó Troighthigh compiled from older materials the Tripartite Life of St Patrick and in 1482 he also compiled the medical treatise Lilium Medicinae (Lile na h-Eladhan leighis).

The name is now anglicised as Troy. Members of the Anglo-Irish de Treo family (associated with Limerick city since 1189) and the Gaelic-Irish Ó Tréamháin family also use the form Troy, making members of all three unrelated families indistinguishable.

== See also ==
- Aicher Ua Traighthech (died 1002/1003), soldier of Corcomroe in the medieval period.
- Domhnall Albanach Ó Troighthigh (fl. 1482), scribe and physician
- Castletroy, County Limerick - originally Caladh an Treoigh.
- Irish medical families
- Troy (surname)
