= Place Jean Rey =

Square in Brussels, Belgium

Place Jean Rey (French); Jean Reyplein (Dutch)
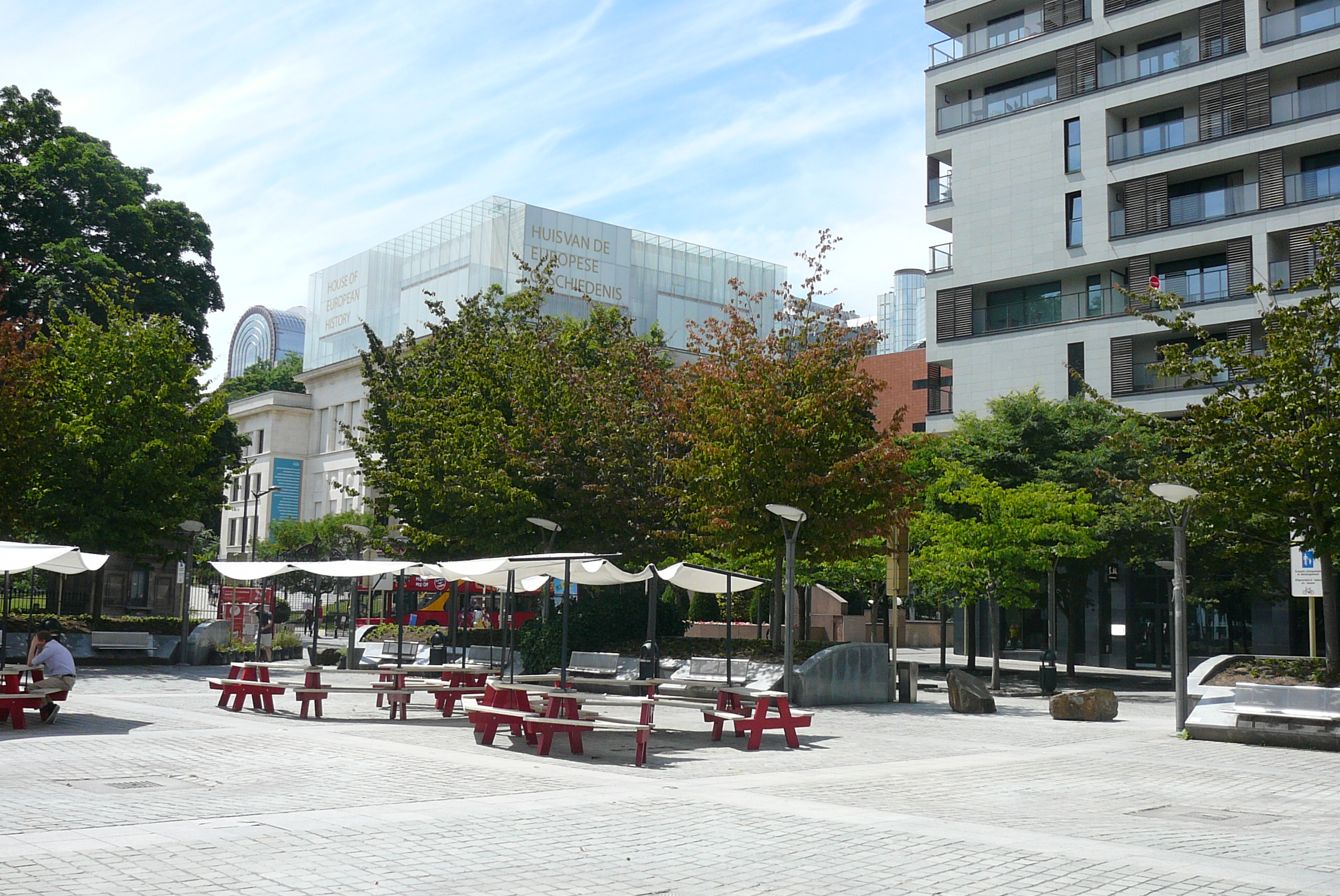
- Looking south-west towards Leopold Park, the House of European History (HEH) and the European Parliament

- Location within Brussels Location within Belgium
- Namesake: Jean Rey
- Type: Square
- Location: City of Brussels, Brussels-Capital Region, Belgium
- Quarter: Leopold Quarter
- Postal code: 1040
- Nearest metro station: 1 5 Maelbeek/Maalbeek and Schuman
- Coordinates: 50°50′26″N 04°22′48″E

Construction
- Completion: 2001

The Place Jean Rey (French, pronounced [plas ʒɑ̃ ʁɛ]) or Jean Reyplein (Dutch, pronounced [ʒɑ̃ ˈrɛiˌplɛin]) is a square in the European Quarter of Brussels, Belgium. It was inaugurated in 2001 and is named after Jean Rey, the second president of the European Commission.

The headquarters of some of the major EU institutions, including those of the Council of the European Union and the European Parliament, are located on or close to the square. This area is served by Brussels-Luxembourg railway station, as well as by the metro stations Maelbeek/Maalbeek and Schuman on lines 1 and 5.

== History ==
The Place Jean Rey was included in plans for the Justus Lipsius building (headquarters of the Council of the European Union) in 1984. Its construction was delayed due to controversies about the area around the Justus Lipsius, legal difficulties, and failed schemes such as plans to demolish a large residential area. Belgian authorities created the space in 2001, as it was thought their reputation would be tarnished if they did not manage to improve the foreboding image of the European Quarter. It was inaugurated at the start of the Belgian EU presidency on 26 June 2001.

== Layout ==
The Place Jean Rey is paved with natural stone, bordered by plant boxes and benches facing 24 water jets in the centre, which mirror the Maelbeek collector and storm basin below. Trees line the western side (not open to traffic) mirroring the axis starting at the entrance of Leopold Park across the street to the south. It is named after the former president of the European Commission, Jean Rey, and occupies a space between the Justus Lipsius building (used to hold low-level meetings of the Council of the European Union and provide office space to the Council's Secretariat) and Leopold Park (next to the Espace Léopold of the European Parliament).

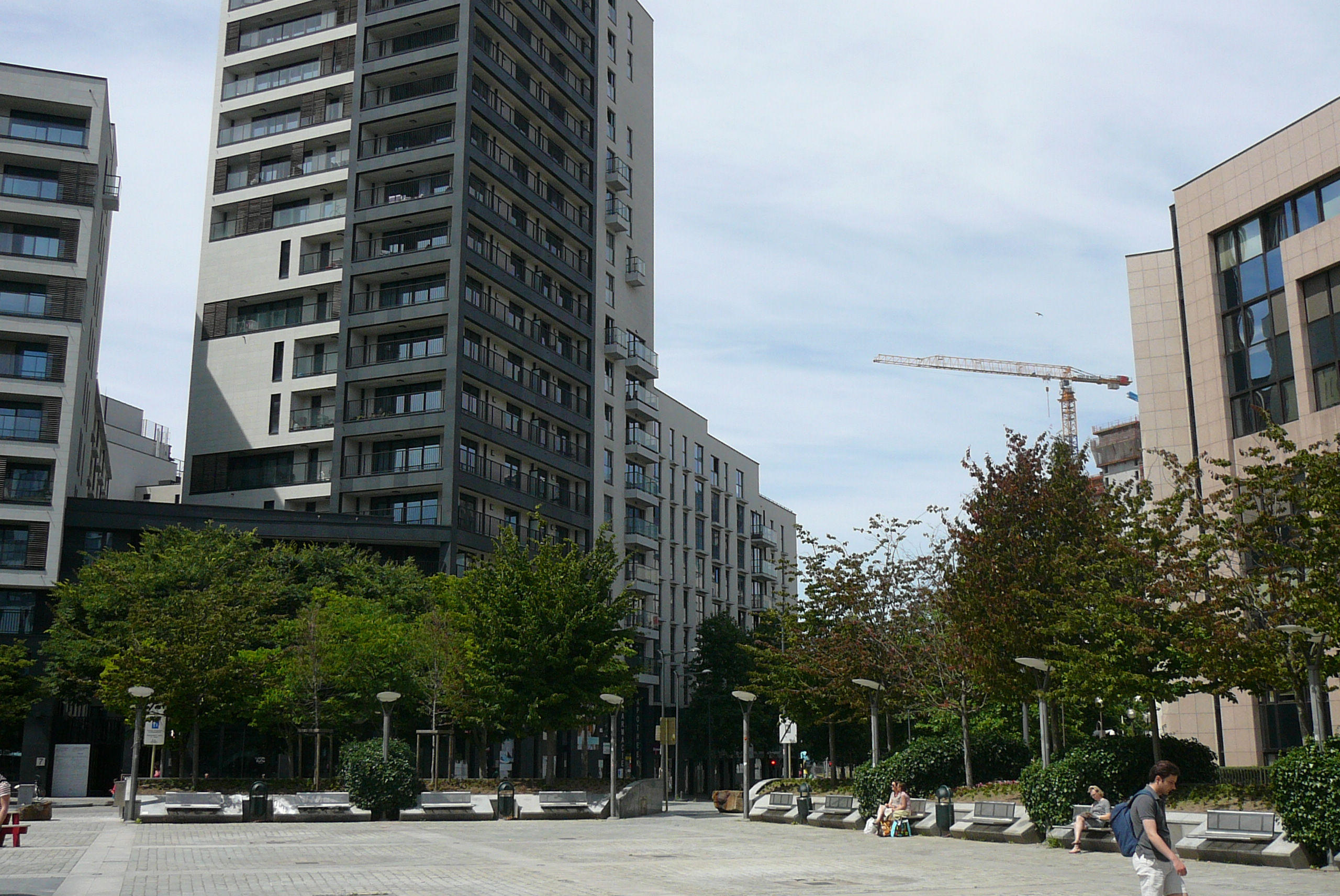
The western side of the square in 2017, with new condominium buildings

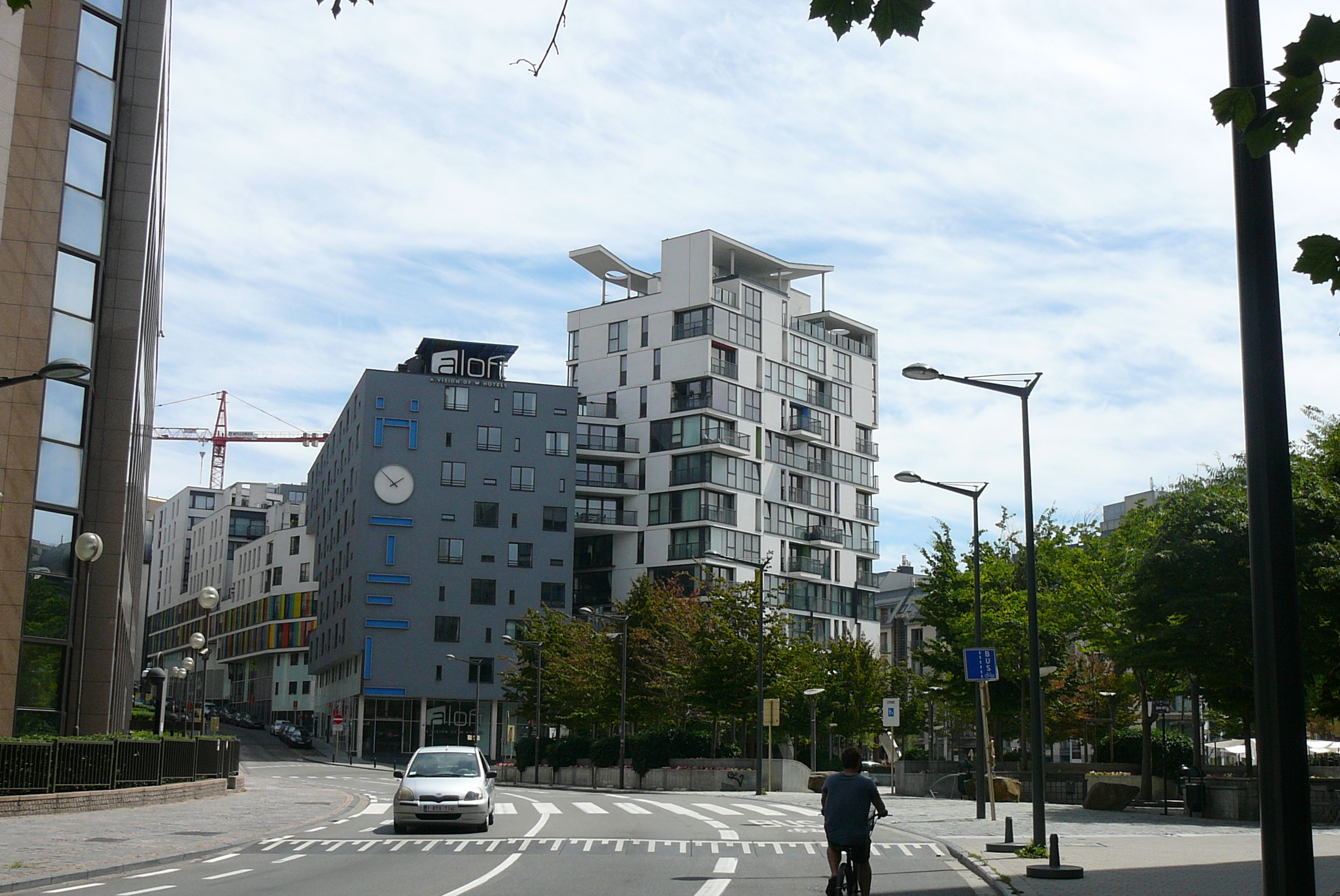
The eastern part crossed by the Chaussée d'Etterbeek/Etterbeeksesteenweg

== Future ==
Plans for the rebuilding of the quarter would see the renovation of the Chaussée d'Etterbeek/Etterbeeksesteenweg into a tree-lined avenue. The renovated section would terminate at the Place Jean Rey, which would become a traffic island, with the west side being turned into a road. This would remove the tree-lined area mirroring the entrance to Leopold Park but there would be trees lining the opposite sides of the road to the north, west and east, a new fountain in the south west corner and the possibility of a tram line cutting across the square following the Chaussée d’Etterbeek. The car park to the west would see new buildings built on it, as the east side has been. The bland facade of the Justus Lipsius building, overlooking the square, is also to be renovated with the possibility of the lower floors being demolished to provide a visual link across the square between Leopold Park and the Berlaymont building.

In 2004, the Brussels Intercommunal Transport Company (STIB/MIVB) laid out long to medium term plans to build a metro stop on the Place Jean Rey.

== See also ==
- Brussels and the European Union (details on the quarter)
- Leopold Quarter (a more historic area in which the square resides)
