= Ó Caiside =

Family name

Ó Caiside is the name of a Gaelic-Irish family. It is now usually anglicised as Cassidy.

The surname Ó Caiside was found in all regions of medieval Ireland, it been the name of several unrelated families.

The most well-known Ó Caiside family were natives of what is now County Fermanagh, where they were poets, churchmen, scholars and hereditary physicians to the Maguire Kings of Fer Manach. Main residences of the family were Ballycassidy, north of Enniskillen; Cassidy, in the parish of Derryvullan; and Farrancassidy, on Inishmacsaint. The latter island is on Lough Erne, as is Daimhinis, which was associated with the family. As with other Brehon clans, family members found employment beyond their home regions, usually elsewhere in Ulster.

John O'Donovan recorded the existence of a family of the name in County Clare, who seem to have been descended from the Fermanagh family.

In 1890, one hundred and forty-one Cassidy births were recorded, the majority in counties Donegal, Antrim and Fermanagh.

== Notable Ui Caiside ==
- Gilla Mo Dutu Úa Caiside, poet, fl. 1147.
- Finghin Ó Caiside, died 1322.
- Gilla na nAingel Ó Caiside, died 1335
- Tadhg Ó Caiside, died 1450
- Concobur Ó Caiside, died 1502
- Peirce Ó Caiside, died 1504.
- Feidhlimidh Ó Caiside, died 1520.
- An Giolla Glas Ó Caiside, fl. 1515-1527
- Ruaidhri Ó Caiside, died 1541.
- Tomás Ó Caiside, friar, soldier and poet, c. 1709 - 1773?.
