= Oflag X-D =

World War II German prisoner-of-war camp

- Fischbek, Hamburg
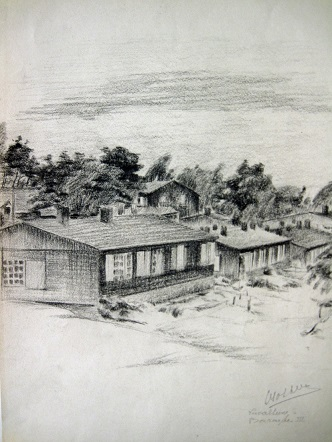
- Drawing of the Administration Barrack III in Oflag X-D by Belgian officer Léon Gossens, 1944

Site information
- Type: Prisoner-of-war camp
- Controlled by: Nazi Germany

Location
- Fischbek, Germany (pre-war borders, 1937)
- Coordinates: 53.4835°N 9.8405°E

Site history
- In use: 1941 – 1945
- Battles/wars: World War II

Garrison information
- Occupants: Allied officers

Oflag X-D was a German World War II prisoner-of-war camp for officers (Offizierlager) located in Fischbek, a Stadtteil of Hamburg, Germany.

== Camp history ==
The camp was established in May 1941. On 22 June 1943, all reserve officers of the Belgian Army held at Oflag II-A in Prenzlau were moved to Oflag X-D Fischbek. The "A" Squadron of the 8th Hussars of the 7th Armoured Division, 2nd Army reached the camp on 23 April 1945 and arrested the guards. The liberated camp inmates, other Allied prisoners and forced labourers were moved to a repatriation camp in Soltau at a later date, organized by Major Huth.

== See also ==
- L'Obstinée, Masonic Lodge
- List of prisoner-of-war camps in Germany
- Raymond Troye
