= Domhnall Albanach Ó Troighthigh =

Irish scribe and physician

Domhnall Albanach Ó Troighthigh (fl. 1477–1482) was an Irish scribe and physician.

Domhnall Albanach was a member of the Uí Troighthigh medical family based in Corcomroe in the medieval era. In 1477 he compiled from older materials the Tripartite Life of St Patrick – a statement at the end of the manuscript states that it was written in 1477 at Bailé an Mhoinin in the house of Ó Troighthigh.

In 1482 he compiled the medical treatise Lilium Medicinae (Lile na h-Eladhan leighis). This manuscript was in 1500 sold to Gerald Mór FitzGerald, 8th Earl of Kildare.

== See also ==
- Ó Troighthigh
- Irish medical families
