= San Joaquin Valley National Cemetery =

Cemetery in California

- Interactive map of San Joaquin Valley National Cemetery

Details
- Established: 1990
- Location: Santa Nella, California
- Country: United States
- Coordinates: 37°06′50″N 121°04′41″W
- Owned by: United States Department of Veterans Affairs
- No. of graves: 28,740
- Website: San Joaquin Valley National Cemetery
- Find a Grave: San Joaquin Valley National Cemetery

San Joaquin Valley National Cemetery is a United States National Cemetery located at 32053 West McCabe Road, Santa Nella, in Merced County, California. This cemetery has space available to accommodate casketed and cremated remains over 322 acres (130 ha) of land. The number of interments through fiscal year 2008 is 30,054.

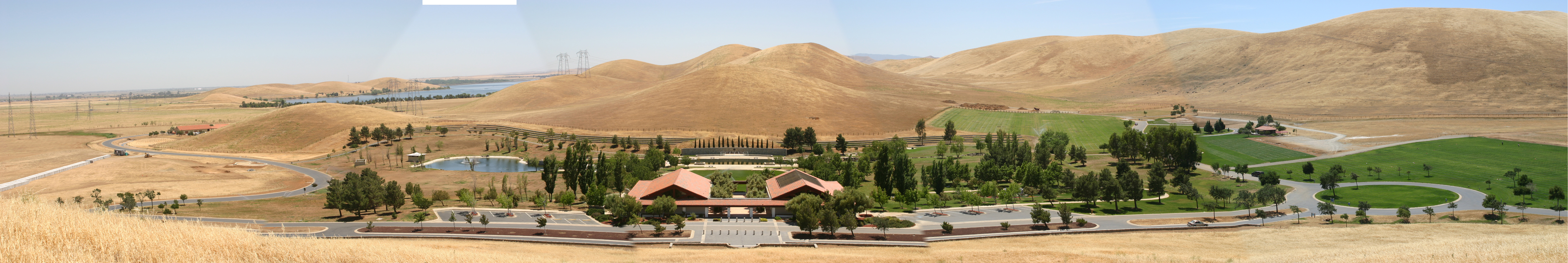

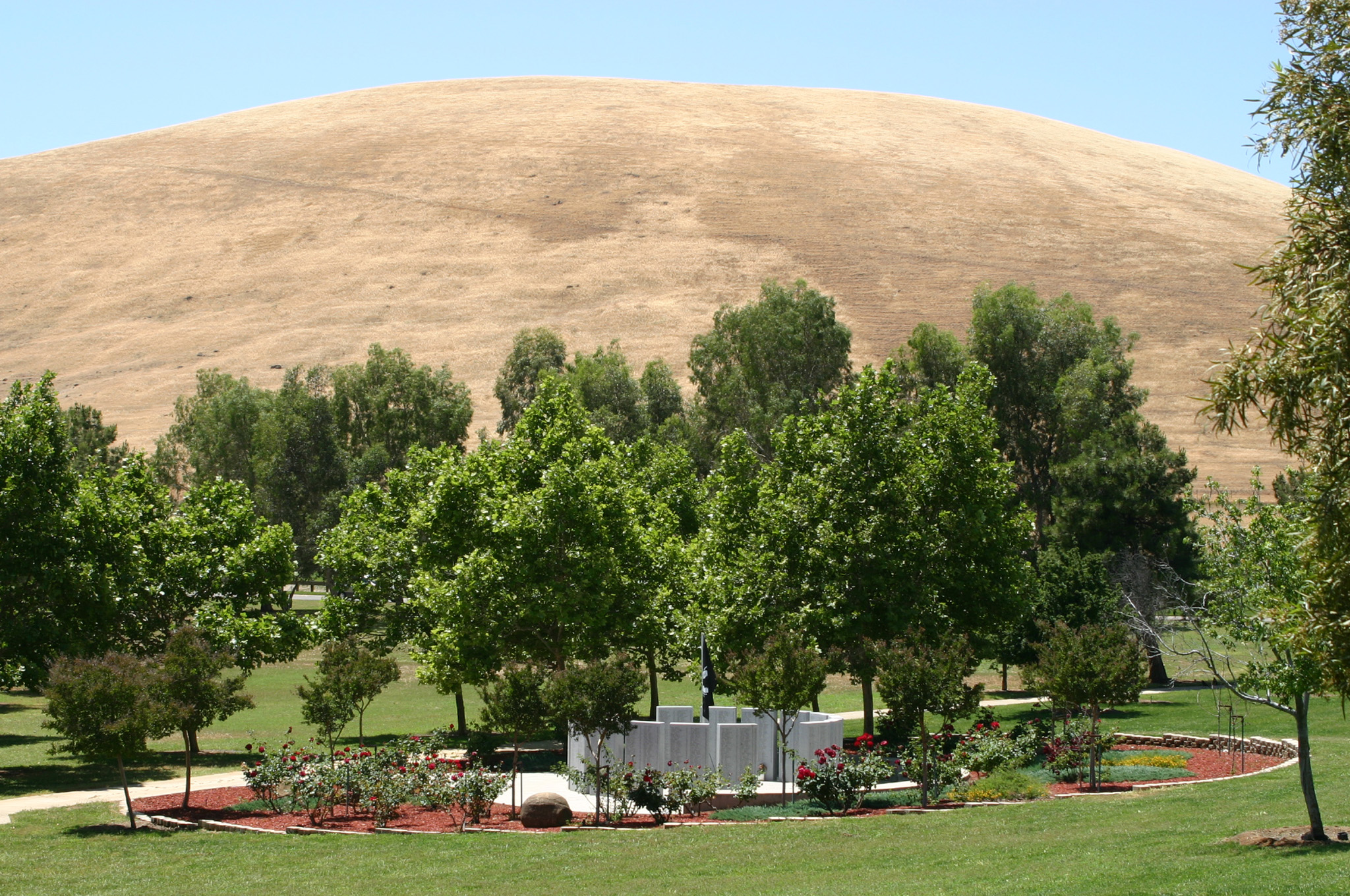
California Korean War Veterans Memorial

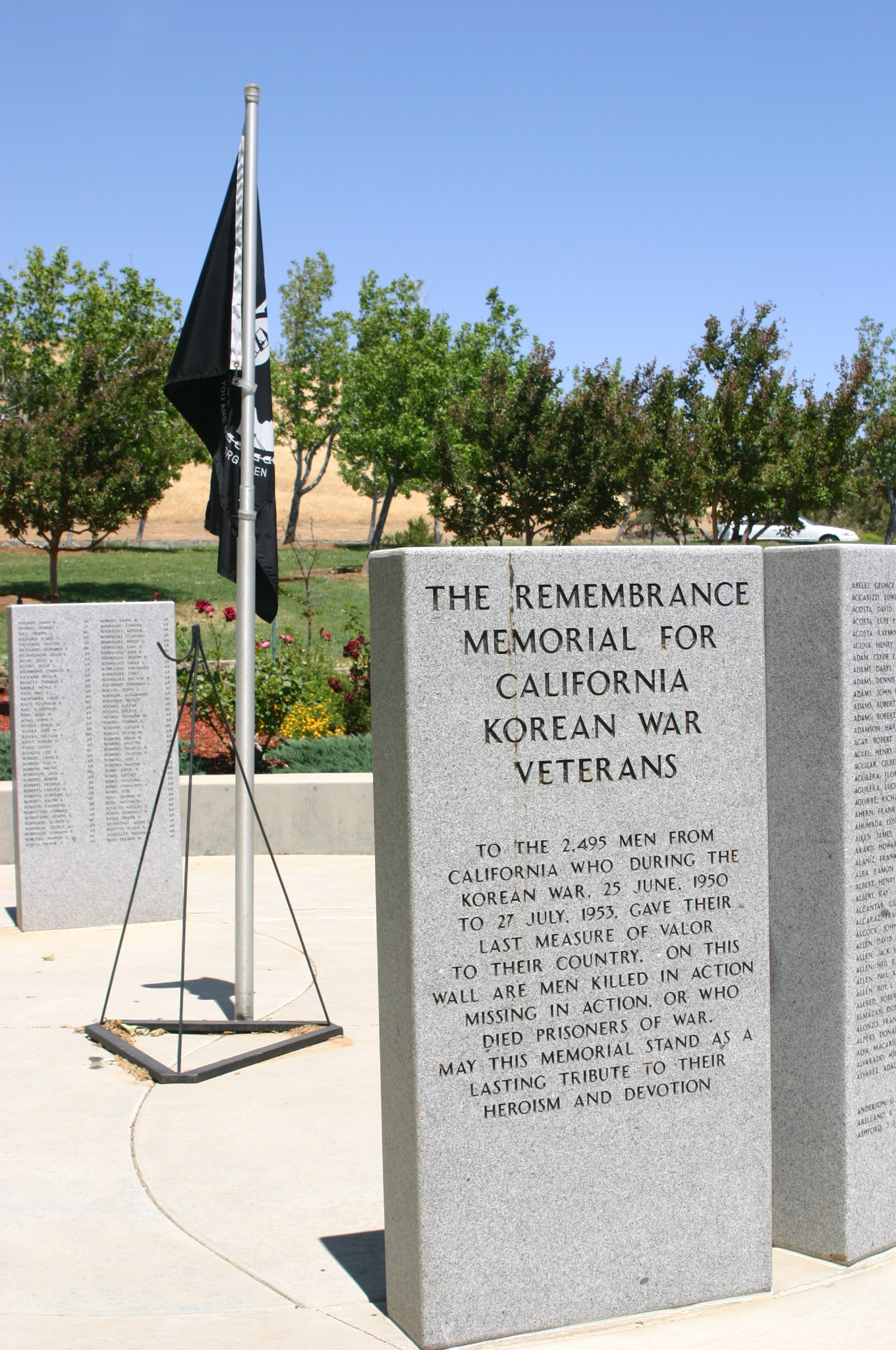
California Korean War Veterans Memorial

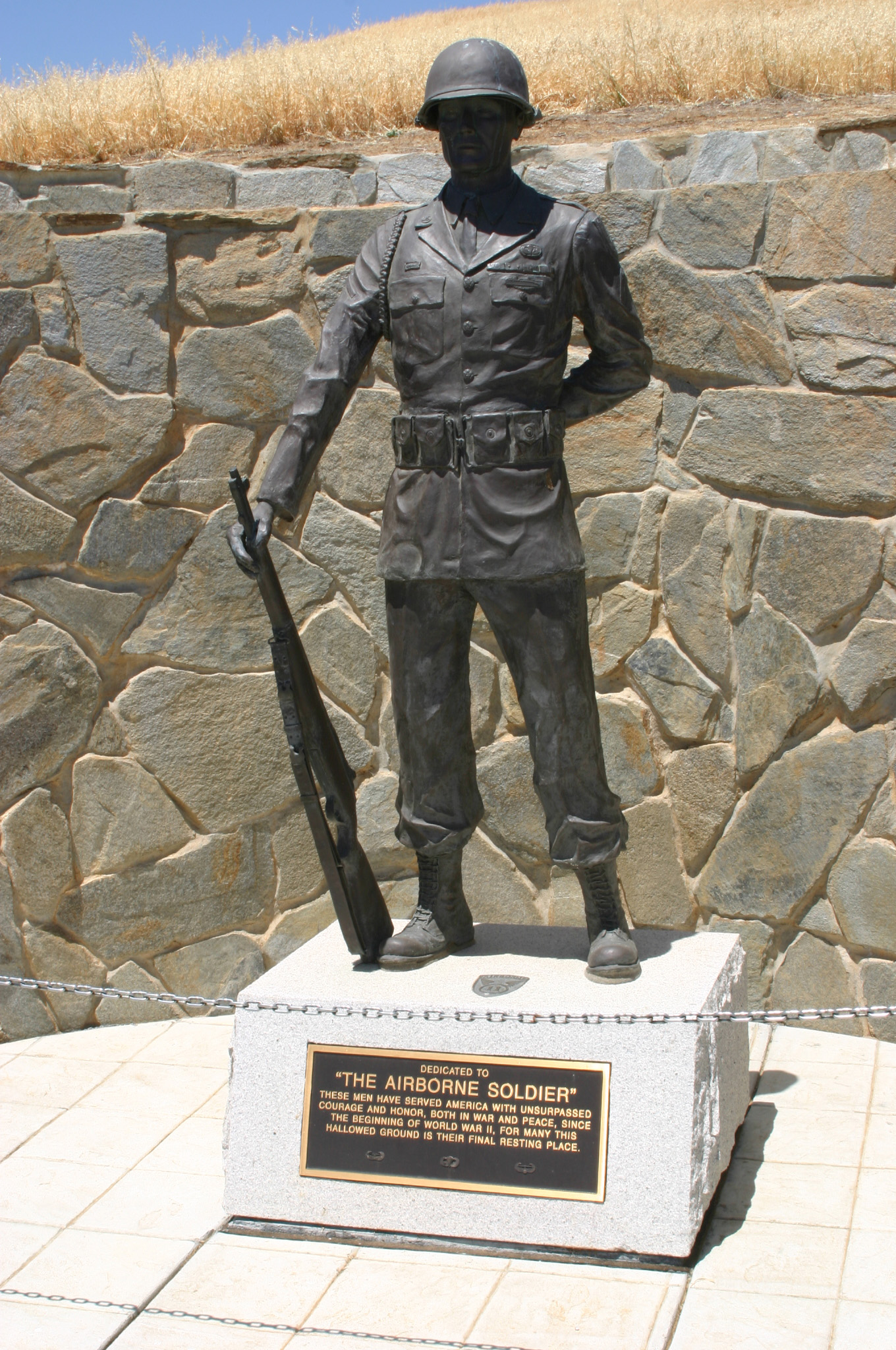
"The Airborne Soldier" memorial

== History ==
In 1989, the Romero Ranch Company donated land to the Department of Veterans Affairs for the creation of a National Cemetery. The first phase developed 105 acres (42 ha) of the land, and was completed in May 1992, giving enough space for the interment of over 20,000 remains.

There is a small military museum on site, which has exhibits of uniforms, medals, and other memorabilia.

== Noteworthy monuments ==
- The California Korean War Veterans Memorial, erected in 1998. It consists of 16 five-foot-tall (1.5 m) granite monoliths arranged in a circle. Engraved on each monolith is the name of the 2,495 veterans from California who died during the Korean War.
- The 11th Airborne Memorial, a granite and bronze monument dedicated in 2002 in honor of all airborne forces.

== Notable interments ==
- Seaman William Troy (1848–1907) – Medal of Honor recipient for action aboard the USS Colorado while assaulting Korean forts in 1871.
- Mac Foster (1942–2010) – Sergeant, United States Marine Corps, and professional boxer
