= Oflag II-A =

- Prenzlau, Germany

Site information
- Type: Prisoner-of-war camp
- Controlled by: Nazi Germany

Location
- Prenzlau, Germany, (pre-war borders, 1937)
- Coordinates: 53.3021°N 13.8209°E

Site history
- In use: September 1939-April 1945
- Battles/wars: World War II

Garrison information
- Occupants: Mostly Polish and Belgians officers

Oflag II-A was a German World War II prisoner-of-war camp located in the town of Prenzlau, Brandenburg, 93 kilometres (58 mi) north of Berlin. It housed mainly Polish and Belgian officers.

The camp, located just south of Prenzlau on the main road to Berlin, and was originally built in 1936 as a barracks for Artillery Regiment 38.

It was opened as a POW camp in September 1939 and housed mainly Belgian and Polish officers. With an area of about 7 hectares (17 acres) the camp was divided into two compounds: Lager A which contained four three-storey prisoner blocks, and an administration and canteen block, and Lager B which contained various garages and workshops, some of which were used as additional prisoner accommodation. The camp was surrounded by a double barbed-wire fence with seven watchtowers.

On 17 March 1945, a group of evacuated sick Polish officers from the Oflag II-C camp reached Oflag II-A.

On 12 April 1945 two bombs dropped by a Russian aircraft hit Block B killing eight POWs, and injuring several others. The camp was liberated by the Red Army on the morning of 28 April 1945.

== Notable inmates ==
- Kazimierz Laskowski, Polish Olympic medalist in fencing
- Raymond Troye, Belgian officer and writer

== See also ==
- List of prisoner-of-war camps in Germany
