= Nealon =

Nealon is a surname of Irish origin. The name is an Anglicisation of the Gaelic Ó Nialláin meaning "descendant of Niallán". The personal name Niallán is from a diminutive of the personal name Niall.

Notable people with the name include:

- Aubrey Nealon (born 1971), Canadian film and television director, producer and writer
- Donie Nealon (born 1935), Irish hurler
- Jim Nealon (1884–1910), American professional baseball player
- Kevin Nealon (born 1953), American comedy actor
- Ted Nealon (1929–2014), Irish politician; TD for Sligo-Leitrim; government minister
- William Joseph Nealon Jr. (1923–2018), American judge
- Jeffrey T. Nealon (born 1963), American philosopher, professor

== See also ==
- Neilan
