= Paul Neilan =

American novelist

Paul Neilan is an American novelist. He is the author of the book Apathy and Other Small Victories.

Apathy follows Shane, a directionless and hopelessly apathetic man in his mid-twenties, and has been compared to Benjamin Kunkel's Indecision, possibly part of a trend of novels focusing on directionless people of an unusually young age for such restlessness. The book was described by Max Barry as being the “funniest book he'd ever read,”' and a review in Daily Kos characterized it as "magnificent, one-of-kind, immensely interesting, a five star must-read, and hilarious", but a review in Booklist characterized it as "Juvenile fun for undiscerning lads with two hours to kill."

In 2021, Neilan published his second novel, The Hollywood Spiral.

Neilan has three brothers: John, Michael, and Ryan. He is the second oldest, followed by Michael and then Ryan. He has 3 nieces and a nephew. Lily Neilan, Lucy Neilan, Avery Neilan, and Quinn Neilan. He lives in New Jersey.
