= William Troy (Medal of Honor) =

United States Navy Medal of Honor recipient

- Medal of Honor recipient
- Born: June 11, 1848; Boston, Massachusetts, US
- Died: March 8, 1907 (aged 58–59); Stockton, California, US
- Burial place: San Joaquin Valley National Cemetery (Section M-1, Grave 53), Santa Nella, California
- Military career
- Allegiance: United States of America
- Branch: United States Navy
- Rank: Ordinary Seaman
- Unit: USS Colorado
- Awards: Medal of Honor

William Troy (1848 – March 8, 1907) entered service in the US Navy from Massachusetts as a United States Navy sailor. For bravery in action during the 1871 Korean Expedition he received the Medal of Honor on June 11, 1871. He was part of the party that rescued the mortally wounded Hugh McKee at Citadel Korea and was himself wounded and specifically commended by the Lieutenant.

Originally buried at the Stockton State Hospital Cemetery, his remains were moved to the San Joaquin Valley National Cemetery (Section M-1, Grave 53) in Santa Nella Village, Merced County, California.

== Medal of Honor citation ==
Rank and organization: Ordinary Seaman, U.S. Navy. Born: 1848, Boston, Mass. Accredited to: Massachusetts. G.O. No.: 169, February 8, 1872.

On board the U.S.S. Colorado during the capture of the Korean forts, 11 June 1871. Fighting at the side of Lt. McKee, by whom he was especially commended, Troy was badly wounded by the enemy.

== See also ==
- List of Medal of Honor recipients
