= Irish medical families =

Traditional european medical practice

Irish medical families were hereditary practitioners of professional medicine in Gaelic Ireland, between 1100 and 1700.

== Overview ==
Professional medical practitioners in the Gaelic world of Ireland and Scotland was mainly the preserve of a small number of learned families who passed the profession down generation by generation. This principle was practised by other learned families of poets, historians, musicians, and lawyers.

According to Aoibheann Nic Dhonnchadha:

These kindreds were involved in medical practise over successive generations, and, collectively, were responsible for the organisation and regulation of medical schools, the formation and development of a curriculum, the practical training of students, and the translation, composition and transmission of medical texts. Physicians enjoyed a high legal status in Gaelic society, and were supported by the hereditary tenure of lands that were granted to them by the landowning aristocracy in exchange for medical services ... While the precise nature and effectiveness of the treatment they gave their patients is unclear, the quality of the intellectual training Irish doctors received in their professional medicals schools was high. They were well equipped to offer their aristocratic employers a medical service that was informed by the best of contemporary scientific learning.

== The families ==
Each province in Ireland had a number of families associated with medical practise. This list is not exhaustive:

Connacht:

- Mac an Leagha (MacKinley, MacAlee,); Mac Beatha (Mac Veigh); Ó Ceanndubháin (Canavan); Ó Cearnaigh (Kearney); Ó Fearghusa (Fergus) Ó Maoil Tuile/Mac Maoil Tuile (Tully, Flood); Ó Laoi/O Laidhigh/O Laoidig (O'Lee/Lee)

Donegal:

- Mac Duinnshléibhe (Donlevy/McNulty) (after 1177 A.D.)

Leinster:

- Mac Caisín (Cashin, Cash); Ó Bolgaidhe (Bolger) Ó Conchubhair (O Connor); Ó Cuileamhaim (Culhoun, Cullen)

Munster:

- Ó Callanáin (Callanan); Ó hÍceadha (Hickey) Ó Leighin (Lane), Ó Nialláin (Nealon) and Ó Troighthigh (Troy)

Ulster (Ulidia):

- Mac Duinnshléibhe (Dunleavy/MacNulty) Ó Caiside (Cassidy); Ó Siadhail (Shields)

== The texts ==
Aoibheann Nic Dhonnchadha writes:

The extensive corpus of medical writing that survives in Irish comprises more than a hundred manuscripts written during the period c. 1400 to c. 1700. These documents, most of which are housed in Irish libraries, are the most important written record extant for the institutional organisation and medical practise of physicians in late medieval and early modern Ireland and Scotland.

Among those that survive are:

- RIA MS 439 (3 C 19) – written by Risteard Ó Conchubhair (1561–1625) and Giolla Pádraig mac Donnchadh Óg Ó Conchubhair
- NLS 73.1.22 – by Donnchadh Albanach Ó Conchubhair (1571–1647)
- RIA ms 996 (23 N 17)
- TCD ms 1372 – partly written by Giolla Pádraig mac Giolla na Naomh Ó Conchubhair
- NLI G 11 – written mainly by Donnchadh Ó Bolgaidhe, fl. 1466–75.
- NLI G 12
- RIA MS 23 P 10 ii – The Book of the Ó Lee's or The Book of Hy Brasil
- Liber Flavus Fergusiorum – compiled by in the 14th century by the Ó Fearghusa of Connacht.

== See also ==
- Crichaireacht cinedach nduchasa Muintiri Murchada lists the families of Ó Ceanndubháin and Ó Laoi as physicians to Ó Flaithbhertaigh
- Medieval medicine of Western Europe
- Domhnall Albanach Ó Troighthigh (fl. 1482), Irish scribe and physician
- Donnchadh Óg Ó Conchubhair
- Corc Ó Cadhla, fl. 1577–78
- Cormac MacDonlevy

== Sources ==
- Diarmaid O Cathain (1988) John Fergus MD: Eighteenth-century Doctor, Book Collector and Irish Scholar in J.R.I.A. 118
- Aoibheann Nic Dhonnchadha (1999) Medical Writing in Irish, 1400–1700, School of Celtic Studies.
- Aoibheann Nic Dhonnchadha (2000) Medical writing in Irish, J. B. Lyons (ed.), Two thousand years of Irish medicine, Dublin.
- Aoibheann Nic Dhonnchadha (2006) The medical school of Aghmacat, Queen's County, Ossory, Laois and Leinster 2, 11–43.
- Katherine Simms, Medical Schools, p. 37, Medieval Ireland:An Encyclopedia, ed. Sean Duffy, 2005.
