= Gilla Mo Dutu Úa Caiside =

Gaelic Irish poet

Gilla Mo Dutu Úa Caiside (fl. 1147) was a Gaelic Irish poet.

== Biography ==
Closely associated with Tighearnán Ua Ruairc, King of Bréifne, he was attached to the monastery of Daminis and possibly to the church of Ard Brecáin, being a cleric.

His two famous compositions are Éri óg inis na náem and the Banshenchas.

The Ó Caiside family later became – from the 14th century – prominent in Fermanagh, and many of them became hereditary doctors to the Maguire chieftains.

His known compositions are:

- Éri óg inis na náem
- The Banshenchas (Ádam óenathair na ndóene)
- Eight poems in the lives of St. Mo Laisse and M'Áedóc
  - Ca lion mionn ag Maodhócc
  - Cert Maodhócc ar shluagh Mhancach
  - Comhroinn Maodhócc, fa mór modh
  - Eittirbretha Maodhócc min
  - Uasal an mac, mac Setna
  - Cia is fearr cairt ar dháil mláisi
  - Cia thairngir mlaisi ria theacht
  - Molaisi eolach na heagna
- Cuibdea comanmann na rig
- Sé rígh déag Eoghain anall
