= Raymond Troye =

Raymond Troye (1908–2003) was a Belgian army officer and writer born in Charleroi. During his imprisonment in Nazi Germany, he wrote 5 novels of which two were published after the war.

As a young lieutenant in the Belgian army, he was captured by the German army in May 1940. He spent a few days in the transit camp of Dortmund, after which he was sent to a camp in Bavaria (Oflag VII-B) where he remained for two years before being transferred to another camp close to Hamburg (Oflag XD). He spent the two last years of the war in a camp located in the north of Berlin (Oflag II-A).

== Bibliography ==
- R. Troye, Meurtre dans un Oflag, Les Editions Atalante, Bruxelles, 1947
- R. Troye, Le Pharmacien de Chantenelle, Les Editions Atalante, Bruxelles, 1947

== Sources ==
- Raymond Troye (French)
