= Kings of Fermanagh =

Throughout the 11th and 12th centuries the Kings of Fermanagh (Fhear Manach or Fear Manach in Irish) O'hEignigh, O'Maolruanaidh and O'Dubhdara were drawn from the Kingdom of Airghialla, Other names include Oirghiall, Oriel, Airgéill and Uriel. The oldest and more correct form is Airghialla denoting both the territory and the inhabitants of the territory. This is stated in the early genealogies to go back to one of the Three Collas. The Ó hEignigh and Maolruanaidh septs were noted as kings of Fermanagh until becoming tributary to the Maguires (Meicc h-Uidir) around 1202.

== Kings of Fermanagh ==
The Annals of the Four Masters mention the following as Kings of Fermanagh:

- Cathal Ó Dubhdara (died 1009)
- Niall Ó hÉicnigh (died 1053)
- Domhnall Ó Mael Ruanaidh (died 1057)
- Giolla Críst Ó Dubhdara (died 1076)
- Ó hÉicnigh (died 1095)
- Laidhgnén Ó Dubhdara (died 1118)
- Ó Mael Ruanaidh (1126)
- Gilla Críost Ó hÉicnigh (died 1127), also over-king of Airgíalla
- Faelán Ó Dubhdara (died 1128)
- Ó Mael Ruanaidh (died 1160)
- Mac an Oíche Ó Mael Ruanaidh (1189)
- Aonghus Mac Giolla Fhinnéin (died 1234)
- Domhnall Mór Ó Domnhaill (died 1241), also king of Tyrconnell
- Flaithbertach Ó Daimin (died 1275)
- Donn Mag Uidhir (died 1298)
- Mac Craith Mag Uidhir (died 1306)
- Flaithbertach Mag Uidhir (died 1324)
- Aodh Ó Domhnaill (died 1333), also king of Tyrconnell
- Ruaidhri Mag Uidhir (died 1338)
- Aodh Ruadh Mag Uidhir (1360)
- Pilib Mag Uidhir (died 1366)
- Brian Mag Uidhir (died 1373)
- Pilib na Tuagh Mag Uidhir (died 1395)
- Tomás Mag Uidhir (died 1419)
- Tomás Mór Mag Uidhir (died 1430)
- Tomás Óg Mag Uidhir (died 1436)
- Éamonn Mag Uidhir (abdicated 1486)
- Tomás Óg mac Tomás Óg Mag Uidhir (deposed 1486)
- Seán Mag Uidhir (died 1503)
- Conchobhar Mór Mag Uidhir (died 1527)
- Cú Connacht Óg Mag Uidhir (died 1538)
- Giolla Pádraig Bán Mag Uidhir (died 1540)
- Seán Mag Uidhir (died 1566)
- Cú Connacht Óg Mag Uidhir (died 1589)
- Aodh Mag Uidhir (died 1600)
- Cú Chonnacht Óg Mag Uidhir (fled 1607)
