= Hickey (surname) =

Hickey is a common surname of Irish origin. The original form Ó hÍceadha, which is still used in Ireland, was one of the Irish medical families in Gaelic times. Notable people with the surname include:

== People ==
=== Arts and entertainment ===
- Adam Hickey (born 1997), English cricketer
- Cheryl Hickey (born 1976), Canadian entertainment reporter for the Global Television Network
- Chris Hickey (singer-songwriter), American singer-songwriter
- Dale Hickey (born 1937), Australian artist
- Dave Hickey (1938–2021), American art critic, author of Air Guitar: Essays on Art & Democracy (1998)
- Eddie Hickey (1902–1980), American sportsman
- Emily Henrietta Hickey, Irish author and translator
- Ersel Hickey, American rockabilly singer
- James Harden-Hickey, 19th-century American writer
- John Benjamin Hickey, American actor
- Kenny Hickey, American musician
- Kirsty Hickey (born 1996), English actress
- Michael Hickey (screenwriter), American screenwriter
- Rich Hickey, American computer programmer, creator of the Clojure programming language
- Steve Hickey (footballer) (born 1965), Australian rules footballer
- Tamara Hickey, Canadian actress
- Thomas Hickey, 1741–1842, Irish painter
- Tom Hickey, Irish actor, known for his role in The Riordans
- William Hickey (actor), American actor
- William Hickey (columnist), pseudonymous byline of a gossip column published in the Daily Express
- William Hickey (memoirist) (1749–1830), English lawyer and memoirist
- May Wynn, actress, born Donna Lee Hickey before taking the stage name "May Wynn," after playing a character by that name in The Caine Mutiny

=== History and current affairs ===
- Charles Hickey (1897–1918), Canadian World War I flying ace
- Elizabeth Hickey (1917–1999), Scottish-born Irish historian and writer
- Colonel James Hickey (soldier), in charge of the US special forces team which captured Saddam Hussein
- Jim Hickey (broadcaster), New Zealand television presenter
- Thomas Hickey (soldier), executed for mutiny during the American Revolutionary War
- Michael O'Hickey (1860–1916), vice president of the Gaelic League and Chair of Irish at Maynooth

=== Politics and law ===
- Adam S. Hickey, American lawyer and former government official
- Bonnie Hickey, Canadian politician
- Eileen Hickey (New York politician) (1945–1999), New York politician
- Eileen M. Hickey (1886–1960), Northern Irish politician
- Huhana Hickey, New Zealand Māori lawyer and disability advocate
- James Hickey (c.1837 – c.1885, Irish Fenian and Land Leaguer
- James Hickey (Irish politician) (c. 1886 – 1966), Labour TD and Lord Mayor of Cork
- Joe Hickey (politician), American politician
- Maggie Hickey, Australian politician
- Stephen Hickey, British diplomat
- Vivian Hickey (1916–2016), American politician and educator
- William J. Hickey, New York politician and judge

=== Religion ===
- Antony Hickey (1586–?) Irish Franciscan theologian
- Barry Hickey (Born 1936), Catholic bishop in Western Australia
- David Francis Hickey (1882–1973), American-born Catholic bishop in Belize
- Steve Hickey (born 1967), American pastor and politician
- Rev. William Hickey (1787–1875), Irish priest, writer and philanthropist

=== Science and academics ===
- Barbara Hickey, Canadian-born American oceanographer
- Joseph Hickey (ornithologist) (1907–1993), American ornithologist
- Raymond Hickey, Irish linguist
- Timothy J. Hickey, a professor of computer science

=== Sports ===
- Aaron Hickey (born 2002), Scottish footballer
- Ambrose Hickey (1945–2016), Irish Gaelic footballer
- Anthony Hickey (born 1992), American basketball player, the Israeli Basketball Premier League
- Charles Hickey (cricketer) (1880–1919), New Zealand cricketer
- Charlie Hickey (coach) (born 1964), American college baseball coach
- Chris Hickey, Australian rugby union coach
- Colin Hickey (1931–1999), Australian speed skater
- Denis Hickie, Irish international in Rugby union
- Jack Hickey (rugby) (1887–1950), Australian dual internationalist in Rugby union and Rugby league
- Jarrad Hickey (born 1985), Australian rugby league player
- Jim Hickey (American football) (1920–1997), American
- Jim Hickey (baseball coach) (born 1961), American
- Jimmy Hickie (1915–1973), Scottish footballer (Clyde, Asturias)
- Joe Hickey (footballer) (1929–2021), Australian rules footballer
- Miriam Hickey, American soccer player
- Noah Hickey (born 1978), New Zealand football player
- Noel Hickey, Irish sportsman
- Pat Hickey (born 1953), Canadian ice hockey player
- Pat Hickey (sports administrator) (born 1945), Irish sports administrator
- Red Hickey (1917–2006), American athlete, played American football
- Reg Hickey (1906–1973), player and coach for Geelong in Australian rules football
- Sacha Hickey (born 2003), English boxer
- Thomas Hickey, Canadian ice hockey player, L.A. Kings
- William Hickey (basketball) (born 1999), Australian basketball player

== Fictional characters ==
- Buzz Hickey, in the NBC show Community
- Cornelius Hickey, in Dan Simmons' book and its TV adaptation, both titled The Terror
- Earl Hickey, in the NBC show My Name Is Earl
- Randy Hickey, in the NBC show My Name Is Earl

== See also ==
- Hickey (disambiguation)
- Hickley
- Hinkley
- Mickley (disambiguation)
- Tickley
- Irish medical families
- Ó hÍceadha
