= Hickley =

Hickley is a surname.

== List of people with the surname ==
- Anthony Hickley (1906–1972), English first-class cricketer
- Cecil Hickley (1865–1941), British Royal Navy officer
- Charles Hickley (1862–1935), English first-class cricketer and barrister
- Frank Hickley (1895–1972), English cricketer
- Henry Hickley (1826–1903), British Royal Navy officer
- William Hickley Gross (1837–1898), American bishop

== See also ==
- Hickey (surname)
- Hinkley
- Mickley (disambiguation)
- Tickley
