= Hickey (disambiguation) =

A hickey is a mark on the skin caused by amorous contact.

Hickey may also refer to:

== Places ==
- Hickey Run, tributary of the Anacostia River in Washington, D.C., USA
- Hickey Settlement, Ontario, a community in Hastings Highlands, Ontario, Canada
- Hickey-Osborne Block, historic area in Peabody, Massachusetts, USA

== People ==
- Hickey (surname), including list of people with the surname

== Arts, entertainment, and media ==
=== Films ===
- Hickey (film), a 2016 coming of age film directed by Alex Grossman
- Hickey & Boggs, 1972 film noir detective movie written by Walter Hill, co-starring and directed by Robert Culp

=== Other uses in arts, entertainment, and media ===
- Hickey (album), by Australian indie rock band Royel Otis
- Hickey (band)
- Hickey (Chinese girl group)
- Hickey's Bengal Gazette, first printed newspaper to be published in the Indian sub-continent

== Other uses ==
- Hickey, a placeholder name, shortened form of doohickey
- Hickey College, private career college in St. Louis, Missouri, USA
- Hickey Freeman, manufacturer of suits for men and boys, based in Rochester, New York, USA
- Hickey plot, a rumored plot to kill George Washington involving executed soldier Thomas Hickey
