= Wenzhe =

- Traditional Chinese: 文哲 文喆
- Simplified Chinese: 文哲 文喆
- Hanyu Pinyin: Wénzhé
Transcriptions
Standard Mandarin
- Hanyu Pinyin: Wénzhé

Wenzhe or Wen Zhe is the Mandarin Pinyin spelling of a Chinese male given name meaning "literature and philosophy". The same name is also spelled Wen-cher in Mandarin Wade-Giles (used in Taiwan) and Wen-je in Cantonese pronunciation.

People with this name include:

- Wen Zhe (文哲), Chinese Rapper from Chinese idol musical girl group Hickey (born 1997)
- Goh Wen Zhe, Singapore athlete who won a bronze medal in Water polo at the 2019 SEA Games – Men's tournament
- Hu Wenzhe (胡文喆), Chinese actor (born 1993)
- Ko Wen-je (born 1959), Taiwanese politician and physician
- Liu Wenzhe (1940-2011), International Master chess player
- Zhao Wenzhe (born 2001), Chinese footballer

== See also ==
- Chinese given name
