= Lickley =

Lickley is a surname. Notable people with the surname include:

- Laurie Lickley, American politician and rancher
- Martin Lickley (born 1957), English cricketer
- Robert Lickley (1912–1998), Scottish aerospace engineer

== See also ==
- Hickley
