= William Hickey (writer) =

Irish writer and philanthropist

Reverend William Hickey, also known as Martin Doyle (1787 – 24 October 1875) was an Irish writer and philanthropist.

== Life ==
A descendant of the Ó hÍceadha family of physicians, he was the eldest son of Rev. Ambrose Hickey, Church of Ireland rector of Murragh, County Cork. He graduated from St. John's College, Cambridge, and received his M.A. from the University of Dublin. He was ordained in 1811 and appointed curate of Dunleckny, County Carlow. Between then and 1834 he served at Bannow, Kilcormick, Wexford and Mulrankin, remaining at the latter till his death. A Compendium of Irish Biography says of him:

"When at Bannow he started the South Wexford Agricultural Society and the Bannow Agricultural School, both of which flourished while under his superintendence. As a parochial clergyman he was esteemed alike by Catholics and Protestants. He commenced his career as a writer in 1817, his first work being a pamphlet on the State of the Poor in Ireland. Afterwards followed a series of letters under the pseudonym of "Martin Doyle," under which he continued to write. ... He ... was a regular contributor to Blackwood's Agricultural Magazine, Chambers' Journal, and other periodicals. His latest production, published a few years before his death, was Notes and Gleanings of the County Wexford. In all his writings he took the broadest philanthropic views, studiously avoiding religious and political controversy. He was awarded a gold medal by the Royal Dublin Society, in recognition of his services to Ireland, and enjoyed a pension from the Literary Fund. He was a man of an eminently charitable and feeling nature, and died comparatively poor, 24th October 1875, aged 87. These particulars of his life have been furnished by George Griffiths, author of Chronicles of the County of Wexford, one of the best authorities upon biographical and archaeological lore of that part of Ireland."

Hickey, under the pseudonym Martin Doyle, served as an editor for The Irish Farmer's and Gardener's Magazine.

William Hickey was the father of J. S. Hickey, Protestant rector of Goresbridge, and grandfather of the author and poet, Emily Henrietta Hickey.

== Select bibliography ==
- Hints to Small Farmers
- The Hurlers
- Irish Cottagers
- Plea for Small Farmers
- Address to Landlords
- The Kitchen Garden
- The Flower Garden
- Hints on Emigration to Canada
- Hints on Health
- Temperance and Morals
- Book on Proverbs
- Cyclopaedia of Practical Husbandry
- French Sermons by Monod (translator)
- Notes and Gleanings of the County Wexford
