= Hickey-Osborne Block =

- Hickey–Osborne Block
- U.S. National Register of Historic Places
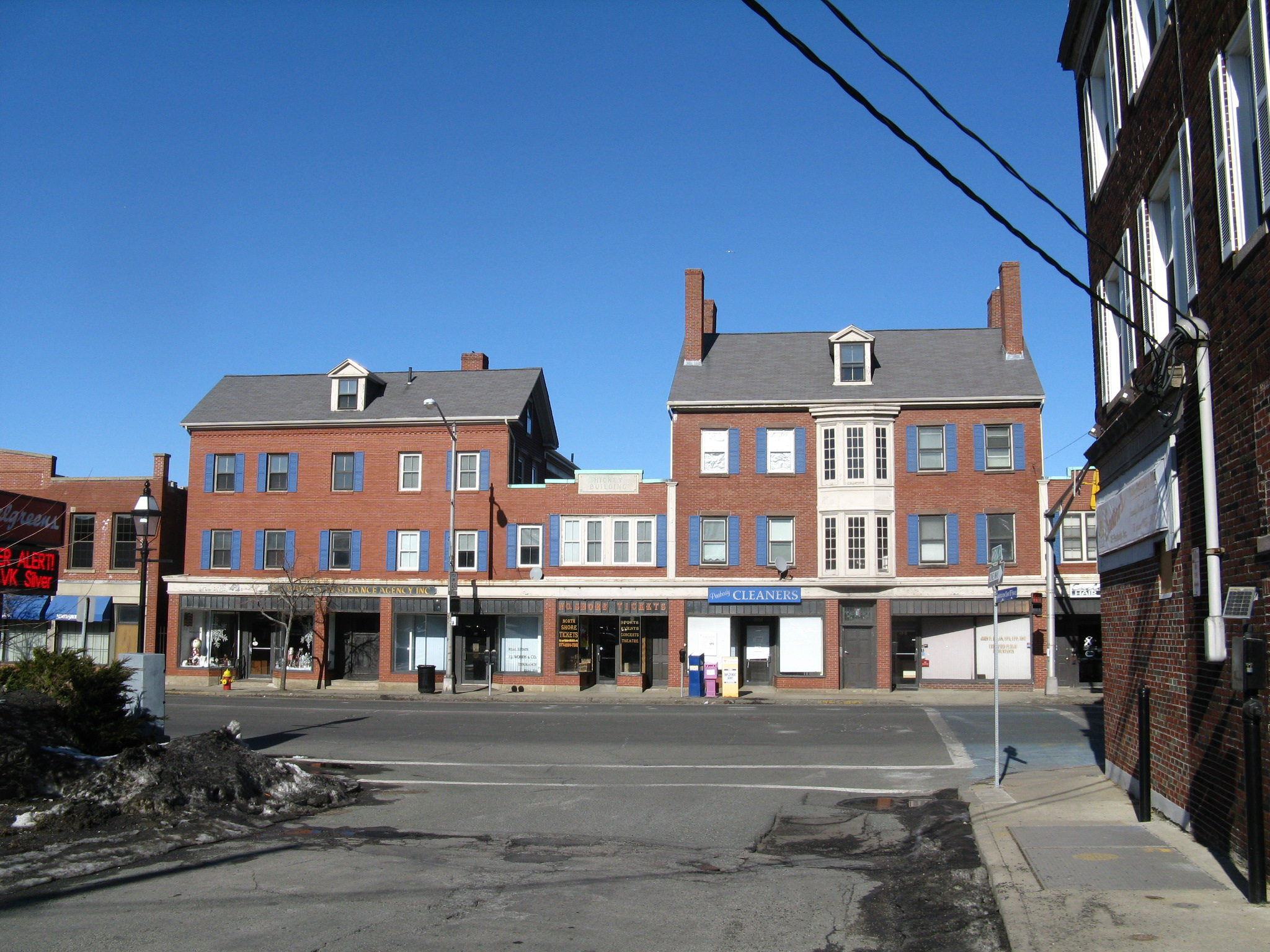
- Hickey Building

- Location within Massachusetts Location within the United States
- Location: 38–60 Main St., Peabody, Massachusetts
- Coordinates: 42°31′32″N 70°55′33″W
- Area: 1.2 acres (0.49 ha)
- Built: 1797
- Architectural style: Greek Revival, Federal
- NRHP reference No.: 85002416
- Added to NRHP: September 19, 1985

The Hickey—Osborne Block is a historic commercial-residential building in Peabody, Massachusetts. It is a distinctive repurposing of three residential structures, dating as far back as 1797, by raising them and building brick commercial ground floors beneath them. The building was listed on the National Register of Historic Places in 1985.

== Description and history ==
The Hickey-Osborne Block occupies a long portion of a city block on the north side of Main Street east of Peabody Square in downtown Peabody, opposite its junction with Park Street. The building has five groundfloor storefronts, reflective of the history of its construction. The upper levels consist of three wood-frame houses, each 2 1/2 stories in height, thus giving the building as a whole a height of 3 1/2 stories. In the gaps between these houses are stylistically linked single-story flat-roof wood frame commercial elements.

The oldest portion of the block is the easternmost house, built about 1797 for John Upton, while the other two houses date to about 1835. All have five-bay facades in the Federal style, although the middle house has had its center bays replaced by a two-story bay window structure. The Upton House was raised on 1897 by S. Osborne, and its ground floor was remodeled in the 1960s to match the other elements of the building. The houses of Daniel Dodge and Ebenezer Sprague Upton were raised in 1923. At that time, the infill sections between the buildings were also added. This development is reflective of the transition of Peabody's downtown Main Street from a mainly residential area to one that is now entirely commercial. The three houses are the best-preserved reminders of the area's residential past.

== See also ==
- National Register of Historic Places listings in Essex County, Massachusetts
