= Barbara Hickey =

Canadian-born American oceanographer

Barbara Mary Hickey
- Education: University of California, San Diego; Scripps Institution of Oceanography; University of Toronto
- Scientific career
- Workplaces: University of Washington
- Thesis: The Pacific equatorial undercurrent, a velocity and hydrographic section : a study of the relationship between its driving forces, and a time dependent linear model for its zonal velocity (1975)

Barbara Mary Hickey is an Emeritus Professor of Oceanography at the University of Washington. Her research involves field measurements and computational models to understand coastal processes. She is a Fellow of the American Geophysical Union.

== Early life and education ==
Hickey is from Canada. She studied physics at the University of Toronto, where she was encouraged by a Professor to choose a "softer" field, such as Oceanography. She earned her doctoral degree at the Scripps Institution of Oceanography in 1975. Her doctoral research involved studying equatorial processes such as El Niño. She was involved with the first attempt to monitor the equatorial undercurrent using moored buoys.

== Research and career ==
When Hickey started her academic career at the University of Washington she was one of only a handful of women working in physical oceanography in the United States. Hickey combines onshore sampling and offshore measurements with computational models of water movement, salinity and temperature off the coast of Washington. She also studies plankton fluorescence and offshore oxygen. She was involved with several large field and computational programs, including;

- RISE, River Influences on Shelf Processes, an interdisciplinary study of the dynamics that govern mixing river and coastal waters.
- ECOHAB-PNW, a project that studied the physiology and toxicology of Pseudo-nitzschia off the coast of the Pacific Northwest.
- PNWTOX, Pacific Northwest Toxins–the Columbia River plume and harmful algal blooms (HABs) in the Pacific Northwest.

Her work resulted in the development of sophisticated computer models that could predict the movement of harmful algal blooms. In 1988 Hickey was elected President of the Ocean Sciences Section of the American Geophysical Union.

Hickey was elected a Fellow of the American Meteorological Society in 1992 and the American Geophysical Union in 2014.

=== Selected publications ===
Her publications include:

- Hickey, Barbara M. (1979). "The California current system—hypotheses and facts". Progress in Oceanography. 8 (4): 191–279. Bibcode:1979PrOce...8..191H. doi:10.1016/0079-6611(79)90002-8.
- Hickey, Barbara M.; Banas, Neil S. (2003). "Oceanography of the U.S. Pacific Northwest Coastal Ocean and estuaries with application to coastal ecology". Estuaries. 26 (4): 1010–1031. doi:10.1007/BF02803360. S2CID 52107174.
- Hickey, Barbara M. (1992). "Circulation over the Santa Monica-San Pedro Basin and Shelf". Progress in Oceanography. 30 (1–4): 37–115. Bibcode:1992PrOce..30...37H. doi:10.1016/0079-6611(92)90009-O.

== Personal life ==
Hickey is married with two daughters.
