= Huhana Hickey =

New Zealand Māori lawyer and disability advocate

Susan Jane Huhana Hickey MNZM is a New Zealand Māori lawyer and disability advocate.

== Biography ==
Hickey grew up in Taranaki, in New Zealand's North Island. She left high school after three years' study and initially trained to be a nurse aide, however had to discontinue her training when the symptoms of her multiple sclerosis began to increase. She enrolled at the University of Waikato to study psychology and later law. Hickey completed a PhD in law at the university, becoming the first Māori woman, second Māori and first disabled person to do so.

In 2008, Hickey became the first lawyer to work for Auckland Disability Law. Hickey is a member of the New Zealand Human Rights Review Tribunal.

Hickey became a member of the New Zealand Order of Merit in 2015 for services to people with disabilities.

She served on the board of Housing New Zealand 2018-2019.
