= Anthony Hickley =

English cricketer

Anthony North Hickley (10 March 1906 – 5 September 1972) was an English first-class cricketer active in the late 1920s and early 1930s who played for Middlesex. He was born in Marylebone; educated at Radley College and Merton College, Oxford (1924–1927); and died in Glencalvie.
