= Charles Hickley =

English cricketer and barrister

Personal information
- Full name: Charles Lushington Hickley
- Born: 19 November 1862; Ham Common, Surrey, England
- Died: 2 July 1935 (aged 72); Paddington, London, England
- Batting: Right-handed
- Bowling: Right-arm fast-medium

Domestic team information
- Years: Team
- 1883: Oxford University

Career statistics
Competition	First-class
Matches	1
Runs scored	29
Batting average	14.50
100s/50s	–/–
Top score	15
Balls bowled	56
Wickets	0
Bowling average	–
5 wickets in innings	–
10 wickets in match	–
Best bowling	–
Catches/stumpings	–/–
- Source: Cricinfo, 6 May 2020

Charles Lushington Hickley (19 November 1862 – 2 July 1935) was an English first-class cricketer and barrister.

The son of Thomas Allen Hickley, he was born in November 1862 at Ham Common, Surrey. He was educated at Winchester College, before going up to Pembroke College, Oxford in 1881. While studying at Oxford, he made a single appearance in first-class cricket for Oxford University against the Marylebone Cricket Club (MCC) at Oxford in 1883. Batting twice in the match, he was dismissed for 14 runs by Wilfred Flowers in the Oxford first innings, while in their second innings he was dismissed for 15 runs by the same bowler. In the MCC first innings, Hickley bowled fourteen wicketless overs with his right-arm fast-medium bowling, conceding 25 runs.

A student of the Inner Temple, he was called to the bar in 1887. Hickley died at Paddington in July 1935.
