= The Planet on Sunday =

British newspaper

The Planet on Sunday was a British tabloid Sunday newspaper that launched on 16 June 1996 and ran for only one edition. It was founded at a cost of £500,000 by Clifford Hards, an entrepreneur who made his fortune through operating budget coach holidays from the UK to Austria and Eastern Europe, with the intention of the paper highlighting environmental and conservation issues.

The paper was edited by former Sunday Sport journalist Austin Mitchelson, and aimed at the same reader demographic as The Mail on Sunday and the Sunday Express.

With content that focused primarily on environmental issues, something about which Hards felt strongly, The Planet on Sunday's inaugural edition set out the newspaper's agenda—calling for a reduction in international trade, something Hards felt would lead to less environmental pollution, and arguing that the United Kingdom would be better off outside the European Union. But the newspaper was noted for some bizarre stories which had a sensationalist tone, among them a report about a jilted gorilla that had resorted to violence, and a claim that sunbathing could lead to people developing AIDS-type illnesses. Also featured was a Dan Dare comic strip by Sydney Jordan and Theyen Rich, the character having been updated for the 1990s.

The Planet on Sunday sold 115,000 copies, but Hards himself was reportedly unhappy with the content. On 20 June 1996 The Independent reported that "he found little else to please him than the Dan Dare comic strip". At a meeting of newspaper staff on 19 June, and following differences with his editor, Hards announced that the newspaper would cease publication. "I feel it is better to withdraw than produce a publication that does not match the ideals of the environmental movement. I do however, appreciate how hard the staff have worked."
