= Ó hÍceadha =

Irish family name

Ó hÍceadha (in English: Hickey; O'Hickey) is a surname of Irish origin. According to historian C. Thomas Cairney, the O'Hickeys were one of the chiefly families of the Dal gCais or Dalcassians who were a tribe of the Erainn who were the second wave of Celts to settle in Ireland between about 500 and 100 BC.

== Naming conventions ==
Male	Daughter	Wife (Long)	Wife (Short)
Ó hÍceadha	Ní Íceadha	Bean Uí Íceadha	Uí Íceadha

== History ==
The Ó hÍceadha surname is especially associated with the Kingdom of Thomond, where bearers of the name were in successive generations a medical family who were physicians to the clans of the Dál gCais, as well as other premier families of Munster and Leinster. Their home territory was Ballyhickey ("Baile Uí Ícidhe", or O Hickey's settlement), its neighbouring townland of Drim, and other townlands around Quin, County Clare. Prior to the 13th century they resided near Killaloe. By tradition, the O'Hickeys were reportedly known for brain surgery, especially the art of trepanning with silver plates the skulls fractures and other head injuries sustained in battle.

Doctors in the Hickey family were famous for their study of medicine and translated many Latin and Greek Medical textbooks over the centuries. In 1403, Nicholas Ó hÍceadha (with Boulger O'Callahan) wrote a commentary on the Aphorisms of Hippocrates, a fragment of which is still preserved in the British Museum, London. In 1489, Donnchad Óg Ó hÍceadha translated the works of contemporary European surgeons, an example being the work of Pietro d'Argeloto, the Chirurgia, into the Irish language. The British Museum holds two further medical works of 1589 by Tomás Ó hÍceadha of Clare, and one by Domhnall Ó Troighthigh for the O'Hickeys. The Book of the O'Hickeys is located in the National Library of Ireland.

== See also ==
- Hickey (surname)
- Irish medical families
- Irish clans
