= Laurence Baxter =

British statistician (1954–1996)

- Born: 28 February 1954; Stoke Newington, London
- Died: 8 November 1996 (aged 42); Long Island, New York
- Education: University College London
- Scientific career
- Fields: Statistics
- Workplaces: Stony Brook University University of Delaware
- Thesis: Applications of alternating renewal processes to reliability forecasting (1980)

Laurence Alan Baxter (28 February 1954, in London – 8 November 1996, in Long Island) was professor of statistics at the State University of New York at Stony Brook.

== Early life ==
Baxter was born at the Bearstead Jewish Maternity Hospital, Stoke Newington. His family lived in Ilford, Essex. He was educated at University College London (UCL).

== Career ==
Baxter's first job (1975–1977) was at an insurance company. He then went to the Central Electricity Generating Board, where he researched ways to predict the available generator capacity given the incidence of breakdowns and the average time required for generator repairs. This work was accepted by UCL for a Ph.D. in 1980.

Baxter was then offered a temporary post as a lecturer at the University of Delaware. The following year, he moved to the State University of New York at Stony Brook (SUNY) where he was granted tenure about ten years before his death.

Leitmann (1997) reports that "Baxter was internationally renowned for his work in applied probability and reliability theory" and that he "published over 45 papers and did extensive consulting in this area". He further argues that the "results of his work on separately maintained components have been incorporated into a widely used AT&T Bell Laboratories software package for calculating various characteristics of system availability". Leitmann also notes that Baxter provided extensions to several classic theories in reliability theory naming these continuum structure functions (CSFs). Also that he researched air pollutions impact on mortality.

Baxter conceived the idea for and was editor-in-chief of the book series Stochastic Modeling, published by Chapman and Hall from 1993. He was an editorial board member for Applied Probability Newsletter, Bulletin of the Institute of Mathematical Statistics, the Journal of Mathematical Analysis and its Applications, Naval Research Logistics and the International Journal of Operations and Quantitative Management.

SUNY established the annual Laurence Baxter Memorial Lecture, which is now given each April at Stony Brook.
