= Adam S. Hickey =

American lawyer and former government official

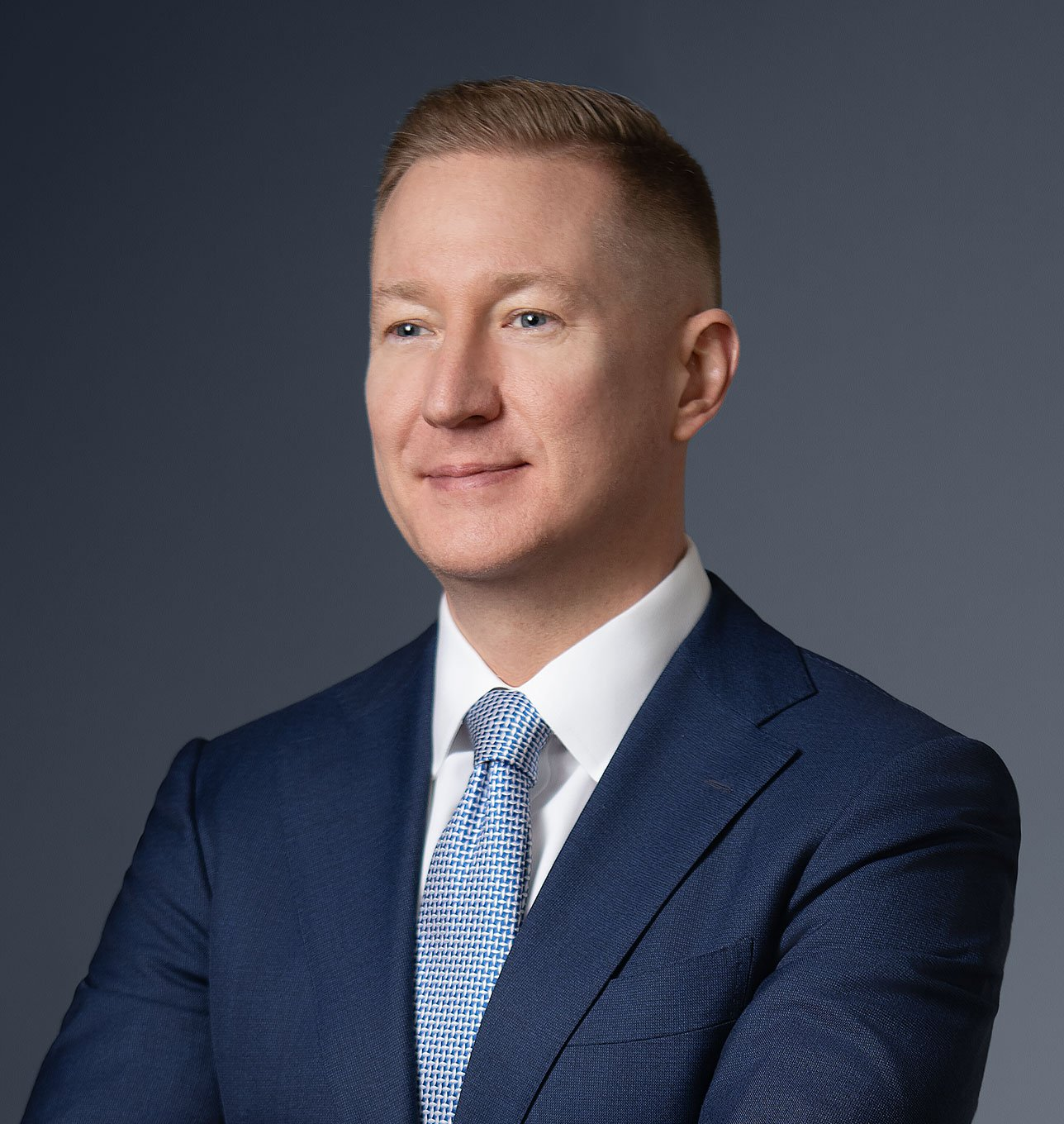

Deputy Assistant Attorney General (National Security Division)
- In office 2016–2023
- President: Barack Obama; Donald Trump; Joe Biden

Acting Deputy Chief for Cyber (Counterintelligence and Export Control Section)
- In office 2013–2015
- President: Barack Obama

Assistant United States Attorney (Southern District of New York)
- In office 2007–2013
- President: George W. Bush; Barack Obama

Personal details
- Born: Adam Sean Hickey
- Education: Harvard University (AB); Yale Law School (JD)

Adam S. Hickey is an American lawyer and former government official. A graduate of Harvard University and Yale Law School, Hickey clerked for various judges in New York City, served as the Assistant United States Attorney at the United States District Court for the Southern District of New York, and joined the United States Department of Justice's National Security Division where he worked from 2012 to 2023 at the intersection of technological and national security concerns.

In 2023, Hickey joined the American law firm Mayer Brown where he has continued to work on cases regarding national security, data, and foreign actors.

== Early life and education ==
Hickey attended Davidson College but transferred to Harvard University in the fall of 1996. At the latter institution, he earned a Bachelor of Arts in government summa cum laude in 1999. He had also served as an editorial editor—and later, an assistant managing editor—for The Harvard Crimson. During his time there, he published several articles on university finance, internal collegiate policy, and the school's search for general counsel in 1997 with Matthew Granade.

Afterward, Hickey enrolled in Yale Law School where he served as the Articles Committee Chair of the Yale Law Journal.

== Career ==
Early in his career, Hickey worked at law firms in New York City; he also served in clerkships for Robert A. Katzmann of the United States Court of Appeals for the Second Circuit and Jed S. Rakoff of the United States District Court for the Southern District of New York (SDNY).

Hickey then became the Assistant United States Attorney for the SDNY in 2007. There, he participated in the Guantanamo Review Task Force and concentrated on matters of national security. He was also part of a 2009 civilian team to indict several individuals, including Khalid Sheikh Mohammed and four others, who plotted the September 11 attacks. He also served as the Deputy Chief of Appeals for a brief amount of time.

In October 2012, Hickey was awarded the Attorney General's Distinguished Service Award alongside Benjamin A. Naftalis and George F. Corey for their prosecution of Al-Shabaab commander Ahmed Warsame for terrorism-related charges.

=== Department of Justice ===
In 2012, Hickey joined the United States Department of Justice's National Security Division (NSD); he became the Deputy Assistant Attorney General in 2016. There, he oversaw the Counterintelligence and Export Control Section (CES), specifically its FARA Registration Unit and the Foreign Investment Review Section. From 2013–2015, he served as the CES' Acting Deputy Chief for Cyber in CES and established a national security cyber program in the department to tackle foreign cybersecurity threats and criminally charge cases against them.

Additionally, Hickey had a hand in reshaping the department's understanding of national security to include modern, economic concerns such as data privacy security. In 2018, at a cybersecurity conference, Hickey discussed several cases from 2015–2018 in which the department prosecuted hackers from China, Iran, North Korea, and Russia and then introduced the department's "changing approach to personal privacy" as not merely a personal matter but also a matter of national security. According to Hickey, the proliferation of new data, or "data growth," due to the internet of things and other technological developments meant that there was more data vulnerability than ever before and therefore "cybersecurity policies and practices need to keep pace as businesses grow and deploy new technologies, such as biometric identification or artificial intelligence."

Hickey also represented the department in the Committee on Foreign Investment in the United States (CFIUS). At a CFIUS conference in 2019, regarding the matter of China and its Made in China 2025 strategem, Hickey introduced the department's China Initiative in order to investigate federal crimes like economic espionage, strengthen American businesses, and identify ways to improve telecommunications to minimize data vulnerabilities. His CFIUS activities have also included negotiations with the Chinese app TikTok regarding American concerns over data privacy and security—the negotiations were the result of the Biden Administration's attempt to strike a regulatory agreement with ByteDance.

=== Foreign Agents Registration Act ===
Shortly after Hickey joined the Department of Justice, the Foreign Agents Registration Act (FARA) was rigorously audited by the department's Inspector General whose 2015 report found that the department lacked an understanding and subsequent means of acting upon its FARA program. As a result, Hickey henceforth oversaw numerous structural FARA reforms—specifically in matters of enforcement and transparency—and subsequently prosecuted numerous new cases using the act.

In 2018 alone, "more than 20 individuals and entities were criminally charged with violations involving FARA—more than the total number charged in the prior 50 years" due to Hickey's reforms involving civil enforcement, increased inspections and audits, and shifting FARA to "a new online system for filing, reviewing, and searching registrations to facilitate compliance... enhance public access... and make information on foreign political activities more transparent."

In 2019, Hickey testified before the House Judiciary Committee regarding "the safety and security of our nation’s elections and to combat malign foreign influence." He discussed the department's efforts to define, categorize, and combat "malign foreign influence operations" which "include covert actions by foreign governments intended to affect U.S. political sentiment and public discourse, sow divisions in our society, or undermine confidence in our democratic institutions to achieve strategic objectives."

Specifically, Hickey discussed cases of election interference from Russia during the 2016 election and the 2018 elections, as well as cases of China affecting public opinion through economic means, media outlets, and college campuses. Hickey then presented the department's analysis of "this vital and evolving area" which included a means to classify "foreign influence activity" through a framework of covert, influence, and/or cyber operations. He then affirmed both the Department of Justice and the Federal Bureau of Investigation's role in strengthening the infrastructure of American elections while investigating and prosecuting election interference from foreign actors, as well as possible collaborations with other agencies to unite efforts.

=== Mayer Brown ===
In early 2023, Hickey left his role in the Department of Justice, after which Andrew Adams served his role in an interim capacity. On May 15, 2023, it was announced that Hickey was hired at the American law firm Mayer Brown, specifically its Cybersecurity & Data Privacy, National Security, and Global Investigations & White Collar Defense divisions where he would continue to work on cases regarding national security, FARA, foreign investment, and other issues he formerly spearheaded at the Department of Justice. In his role, he splits time between Washington, D.C. and New York City.
