= Lowri Shone =

British ballet dancer

- Born: 5 April 1996 (age 30); Winchester, England
- Occupation: Ballet dancer

Lowri Shone (born 5 April 1996) is an English ballerina, trained at the English National Ballet School in London.

Lowri was born in Winchester on 5 April 1996. She has trained at Tring Park for four years. In 2010, Lowri performed the role of Clara with the English National Ballet at the London Coliseum in Wayne Eagling's production of The Nutcracker. Lowri had also previously performed in the English National Ballet's previous production of The Nutcracker, with a minor role. Lowri has also performed in various London Children's Ballet (LCB) productions such as The Scarlet Pimpernel, The Secret Garden and Rumpelstiltskin, as well as performing the role of Petrova in LCB's 2010 production of Ballet Shoes.

== Early life and education ==
Lowri is one of six children: Emma, Rhys, herself, Ciaran, Rowan and Nadja. Lowri started ballet at the age of 6 at the Sally Stanyard School of Dance in Winchester. She obtained further training in tap dance, jazz dance and contemporary dance at the Lewis Allsopp School of Dance, again in Winchester. At the age of 11, Lowri auditioned for dance schools and accepted a scholarship at Tring Park School for the Performing Arts in 2007, forgoing a Mid-Associateship with the Royal Ballet. She has danced with several professional companies including the American Dance Theatre, Royal Northern Ballet and the English National Ballet. In 2010 she danced the role of Young Clara with the English National Ballet in the premier of Wayne Eagling's new version of The Nutcracker. A role which she repeated in the 2011 run of the same production along with her brother, Rowan who played the part of Freddy (Fritz) alongside her, the first time siblings had assumed the role.
