= Panathlon Foundation =

UK charity

- Founder: Ashley Iceton
- Type: Sports Charity
- Registration no.: 1072638
- Location: England
- Website: www.panathlon.com

The Panathlon Foundation is a charity that gives children with disabilities and special needs in England, Wales and Northern Ireland opportunities to engage in competitive sport that they are so often otherwise denied.

Formed in 1996 by Ashley Iceton, the Panathlon Foundation Ltd (registered charity 1072638), provides sports coaching within schools, sports equipment to schools, sports training to teachers, coaches and young leaders, and primarily sporting competitions. Panathlon is aimed at children aged 5 to 19 years with Physical disabilities and Learning Disabilities. They also have specific visual impairment and deaf programmes. As of July 2020, Panathlon works with SEN schools and SEN units in mainstream schools across 43 counties in England and Wales.

== Sports programmes ==
Panathlon has a variety of sports programmes including: multi-sport, Primary Panathlon, swimming, football, impairment-specific, boccia, 10-pin bowling and Xtend.

The multi-sports competitions involve the disability-specific sports of Table Cricket, Polybat, New Age Kurling, Boccia and adapted athletics events. Football includes U13 and U16 five-a-side football and a girls' programme. The charity's impairment-specific events include competitions and coaching for powerchair users, deaf pupils and children with visual impairments. Panathlon's boccia delivery involves a partnership with Boccia England to deliver the Lord's Taverners boccia competitions.

== Scale and impact ==
In the 2008/09 academic year, Panathlon's work engaged 2,500 children in five English counties. By 2014/15, its provision had expanded to 7,500 children across 27 counties. In 2022/23, the charity had 62,981 pupils take part in its programmes - that consisted of 3,012 schools participating in 873 Panathlon events in 44 English counties and 10 areas in Wales. In November 2023, Panathlon held its first ever competition in Northern Ireland.

In October 2023, an independent report showed that Panathlon's positive impact on pupils extended far beyond the physical and mental benefits of taking part in competitions. The research stated that Panathlon was:

- having profound effects on pupils’ education and development
- reducing inequalities for children in areas of social deprivation and geographical isolation
- providing choice in our programmes so that children with all kinds of impairments have activity that meets their needs
- improving the competence and confidence of school staff in delivering inclusive PE and sport

In 2020, in response to the pandemic, the charity launched its Virtual Panathlon programme, training and equipping school staff to host and run Panathlon activity safely in school and for pupils forced to isolate at home. In addition, Panathlon ambassadors and patrons, including Paralympians and sporting role models with disabilities, conducted Q&A sessions with pupils via Zoom to keep them engaged.

== Patrons ==
The charity has several patrons: Paralympians Nathan Maguire and Louise Sugden, former Paralympians Danny Crates, Liz Johnson, Helen Turner and Steve Brown, and TV presenter Alex Brooker. Guests at Panathlon competitions include former sports minister Kate Hoey, ex-Paralympian and TV Presenter Giles Long, and a host of Paralympians, Adam Alderman, Freya Levy, Graham Edmunds, Ben Lampert, Josh Beacham, Tim Prendegast, Dervis Konuralp, Daniel West, and Kate Grey,

== Funders ==
Funders of the Panathlon Foundation include The Jack Petchey Foundation, St. James's Place Foundation, BlueBay Asset Management, Woodland Group, EQ Investors, Pentland Group, MCKS Charitable Foundation UK, Peter Harrison Foundation, Peter Cundill Foundation, Ovingdean Hall Foundation, Redevco Foundation and many more.

Fundraising events have included, Woodland Group cycling from London to Paris in May 2014. Jody Cundy, Danny Crates & Liz Johnson competing in the London Triathlon 2014., Hilton Hotel Stansted hosting virtual 'Around the World in a Day' events., Panathlon supporter Andy Haven running the Atacama Desert Challenge in 2019 and sponsors running the 2021 London Marathon and Royal Parks Half.

== Further information ==
Panathlon has made several appearances on television. Its showpiece London Multisport Final was featured on Sky Sports in June 2010. Panathlon's Central London Final was featured on BBC1 Breakfast Saturday in April 2013. East England regional final was featured on ITV East Anglia in October 2014.

Panathlon has featured regularly at the Queen Elizabeth II Olympic Park. Twenty Panathlon athletes from the five Olympic London Boroughs raced on the 100 metre track at the London Olympic Stadium Gold Challenge test event in April 2012. From 2014 the London Multisport Final competition has been held at The Copper Box Arena. From 2015 Panathlon's South of England Swimming Finals have been hosted by the London Aquatics Centre. John Lewis Stratford, overlooking the park, hosted Panathlon's Jack Petchey Outstanding Achievement Award ceremony from 2012-19.

Other notable venues that have hosted Panathlon competitions are Stoke Mandeville Stadium, The NIA Birmingham (Barclaycard Arena) and Wembley Stadium Powerleague

Panathlon's founder Ashley Iceton is Chief Executive of the charity, Tony Waymouth is Chief Operating Officer and the organisation employs several Event Managers who deliver hundreds of sporting events across the country every year.
