= Joyce McCartan =

- Born: Joyce Buchanan; 1929; Banbridge, County Down, Northern Ireland
- Died: 8 January 1996 (aged 66)

Joyce McCartan MBE (26 November 1929 – 8 January 1996) was a Northern Irish community worker.

== Early life and family ==
Joyce McCartan was born Joyce Buchanan on 26 November 1929 in Banbridge, County Down. Her father was Hugh Buchanan, whose family originally came from Scotland. She had three brothers. Her mother died when she was around 7 years old, which left her with the responsibility of looking after her father and brothers. She attended school in Banbridge, but left at age 14 to work in a cloth factory in Seaforde. She worked there for 2 years, but due to her unhappiness at home, she ran away to Belfast at age 16. There she found work as an assistant in a draper's shop. She met her husband, Seamus McCartan, at a dance hall. They lived in Bagot Street, just off the Ormeau Road. McCartan had been raised Protestant, but her husband was Catholic, and they raised their 8 children as Catholics.

== Activism ==
From the early 1970s, McCartan was involved in local protests along the Ormeau Road organised by women. These protests were on a wide range of issues including the ending of free milk for primary school children and the increasingly high cost of public transport. McCartan later described herself as a "family feminist". To help provide a support network to groups involved in this sort of action, McCartan was involved with the Women's Information Group, which allowed women to lead on local community issues. The services ranged from advice centres to children's facilities to action groups to pressure government bodies. The movement spread across Belfast, and despite the sectarian tension of the time, was a cross community initiative.

Buoyed by the success of the network, McCartan established the Women's Information Drop-In Centre (WIDIC) on the Lower Ormeau Road. This area was badly affected by the Troubles, which led to poor infrastructure and very few public amenities. The WIDIC provided a safe meeting place for women's groups, but also started homework classes for the local children. They grew and sold vegetables and flowers to fund the activities, taking over a derelict chip shop and opening it as the Lamplighter Fish and Chip Restaurant, providing employment and a local, safe meeting place. A youth training operation, Mornington Enterprises, was launched with government support, which trained teenagers in a range of skills including catering, computing, gardening, woodwork and painting and decorating.

McCartan suffered personal loss during this time, with 17 members of her immediate family members dying during the sectarian violence. In May 1987, her youngest son, Gary who was 17, was shot dead by loyalist paramilitaries in the family home. At the time of the attack, she was meeting women in the WIDIC offices, and heard the gunfire and screams from her home. Despite this, she continued her community work, receiving a number of awards including the Irish Pensioner of the Year in 1991, an MBE in 1992, and an honorary doctorate from Queen's University Belfast in 1995. During the visit of US president Bill Clinton to Ireland in 1995, McCartan received Hillary Clinton at the Lamplighter Café in November 1995. Hillary Clinton later recalled that McCartan "gave me an old battered aluminium teapot - which kept the tea very warm, which is what I first noticed about it - that I took with me to the White House where I used it every single day in the second floor private kitchen."

McCartan died on 8 January 1996 in hospital, and is buried at Milltown cemetery, Belfast. The University of Ulster established a professorial chair in her honour, and the inaugural Joyce McCartan lecture in October 1997 was given by Hillary Clinton.
