= Sam Thornton =

English diver (born 1996)

Personal information
- Born: 16 October 1996 (age 29) Baildon, West Yorkshire, England

Sport
- Country: United Kingdom
- Sport: Diving
- Club: City of Bradford Esprit Diving Club

Sam Thornton (born 16 October 1996) is an English diver.

== Diving career ==
Thornton first learnt to dive when he was 6 and was encouraged to take further lessons by a swimming teacher who saw potential is his diving. He was then spotted by a city of leeds diving coach and when he was 7 sam was asked to attend diving lessons at the Leeds International Pool, and has developed from there. As well as his diving commitments, sam also enjoys rugby at school and plays cricket for Thackley C.C.

He lists his best achievements in diving so far as his first gold medal, at the age of 7 in the National novice competition, his silver medal on the highboard at the British junior elite competition.

In 2009, in his first outdoor event, he also won 3 gold medals in 1m springboard, followed by success on the 3m and the platform, at the 16th Barcelona International Diving Championships.

In 2011 he won a silver medal at the British Junior Elite competition. and his first medal at senior level, the Bronze that he won at the Junior European Championshipsin June.

In 2012 he won 3 gold medals at the British Gas National Diving Cup in January and a silver medal at the Junior European Championshipsin June.
