= Frank Hickley =

English cricketer

Personal information
- Full name: Frank Hickley
- Born: 14 December 1895; Leicester, Leicestershire, England
- Died: 28 October 1972 (aged 76); Leicester, Leicestershire, England
- Batting: Right-handed
- Bowling: Unknown

Domestic team information
- Years: Team
- 1921: Leicestershire

Career statistics
Competition	First-class
Matches	2
Runs scored	34
Batting average	11.33
100s/50s	–/–
Top score	27
Balls bowled	24
Wickets	1
Bowling average	18.00
5 wickets in innings	–
10 wickets in match	–
Best bowling	1/8
Catches/stumpings	–/–
- Source: Cricinfo, 25 January 2013

Frank Hickley (14 December 1895 – 28 October 1972) was an English cricketer. Hickley was a right-handed batsman whose bowling style is unknown. He was born at Leicester, Leicestershire.

Hickley made two first-class appearances for Leicestershire in the 1921 County Championship against Gloucestershire and Derbyshire. He scored 34 runs in his two matches at an average of 11.33, with a high score of 27. He also took a single wicket with the ball.

He died at the city of his birth on 28 October 1972.
