= Emily Henrietta Hickey =

- Born: 1845; County Wexford, Ireland
- Died: 1924 (aged 78–79); London, England
- Writing career
- Genre: Poetry

Emily Henrietta Hickey (1845–1924) was an Irish author, narrative poet and translator.

== Biography ==
She was born in Macmine Castle, near Enniscorthy in County Wexford, daughter of the Rev. J. S. Hickey, Church of Ireland vicar of Goresbridge and granddaughter of Rev. William Hickey ("Martin Doyle"), an agriculturist. She studied at Cambridge and then became lecturer in English language and literature at University College London. She sold her first poem, "Told in the Twilight" to the Cornhill Magazine in 1866 and afterwards contributed to Longman's Magazine, Good Words, The Athenaeum, the Irish Monthly and many others. Her first book of poems, A Sculptor, ensured her success as a poet. She followed this with Verse Tales, Lyrics, and Translations (1889), Verse-Translations, and other poems (1891), Michael Villiers, Idealist, and other poems (1891), Ancilla Domini (1898) and Our Lady of May and other Poems (1902). She also wrote many short stories.

With Frederick James Furnivall she founded the Browning Society in 1881.

Hickey wrote about ten books dealing with religious matters after converting to Catholicism in 1901. One of her better-known poems is Beloved, It Is Morn. The poem has been set to music by composer Florence Aylward and recorded by tenors Charles Hackett and Harry Anthony. She died on 9 September 1924 in Marylebone, London.
