= Maz Totterdell =

English singer-songwriter

Marianne Elizabeth "Maz" Totterdell (born 1996) is an English singer-songwriter from Crediton, Devon, England, currently performing under the name Maz McNamara. Her music under her previous stage name, Maz Totterdell, was characterised by indie, folk-pop and poetic lyrics, and has been likened to Lisa Mitchell, Tracy Chapman, and Feist. Totterdell recorded a live BBC Introducing session in 2011. Maz Totterdell was previously signed to indie label, Series 8 Records based in Essex, and her debut single, "Counting My Fingers" was released in January 2012. Her debut album Sweep was released in early 2012.

== Early years ==
She was born in Exeter, Devon. Both of her parents are musicians. Her mother ran monthly open mic nights at The Lamb Inn, Sandford, and Totterdell started performing at these from the age of nine. When she was 10 years old, she reached the final of the UK Unsigned talent competition, which took place at the Hackney Empire, London in July 2007.

Totterdell's mother co-founded a recording studio in Exeter in 2008 and Totterdell spent time there playing and writing songs with other musicians from the age of 11. Between 2009 and 2011, Totterdell wrote around 40 songs. She is self-taught on guitar, ukulele and flute.

In 2011, Totterdell's song, "Never Say Never" was included on Postcards From Within, a compilation CD produced by Crediton Rural Arts & Music Project (CRAMP), featuring singer-songwriters from the South West region.

== Releases ==
Totterdell recorded her debut album in June 2011 in a shed studio situated in Upottery, Devon. The album was engineered by Mark Tucker, who has previously worked with Fairport Convention, Thea Gilmore and Jethro Tull. After hearing "Smile On Sunshine" – one of the tracks recorded for the album – Steve Lamacq played it on his BBC Radio 2 show. Lamacq then invited Totterdell up to Maida Vale Studios on 8 August 2011 to record a live BBC Introducing session for him. The session included the songs: "Little Puzzle", "Counting My Fingers", "Kaleidoscope", and an acoustic cover of Amy Winehouse's "Back To Black". Since then, Totterdell had radio play on BBC Radio 1, 2 and 6, as well as many other local stations including in Brazil, following "Smile on Sunshine" being featured on a Brazilian television advertisement. She later went to perform in Brazil in January 2017.

Since then, Totterdell has been a member of two bands including a five-piece gypsy-ska band named Carnivala!, and a Balkan-inspired hip hop duo, Trotfox. Her solo release, "Flowers in the Stream" was independently released for sale on Bandcamp in January 2017. Subsequent releases have appeared under the artist name, Maz McNamara.
