= Mickley =

Mickley may refer to:

== Places ==
Mickley is the name of several locations in England, such as:

- Mickley, Derbyshire
- Mickley, Northumberland
- Mickley, North Yorkshire
- Mickley, Shropshire

== People ==
- Mickley (Speedrunner), famous for playing the Roblox game Super Blocky Ball.
