= Kirsty Hickey =

English actress

- Born: 17 January 1996 (age 30); London, England
- Occupation: Actress

Kirsty Nicole Hickey (born 17 January 1996) is an English actress.

== Personal life ==
Kirsty was born in London. In 2006, she attended Sylvia Young Theatre School.

== Television career ==
In 2004, Hickey appeared on the BBC soap opera EastEnders in the Christmas party. She played numerous characters Zoe Slater, (Michelle Ryan), Pauline Fowler, (Wendy Richard) and Pat Butcher, (Pam St. Clement) all in famously well-known sketches, as well as singing and playing onset characters. Hickey also appeared in Ministry Of Mayhem on ITV, Granada alongside Holly Willoughby and Stephen Mulhern. She played mini Polly with her trolley with Holly as the older Polly, where they both hosted the game of Cakey Sk8 with celebrities. The rules of the game were that, they propel cakes from skateboards, and the cake which reaches highest up on the wall wins. In that same week, Kirsty met Girls Aloud – this edition was aired live in November 2005. She was interviewed on Richard & Judy about Harry Potter and the Deathly Hallows part one in 2006. She appeared on The X Factor singing and dancing alongside Rhydian Roberts, Same Difference, and the previous year Leona Lewis. On 13 February 2011, Kirsty appeared on Got To Dance with the England tap team, Tap Attack. The team got down to the final 28 acts but did not go through to the finals.

== Film career ==
In September 2009, Hickey filmed The Long Lonely Walk directed by Leon Chambers acting alongside Jeremy Sheffield, Sylvia Syms and Tessa Peake-Jones.

== Theatre career ==
In 2005, Hickey appeared in Billy Elliot at the Victoria Palace Theatre, as the youngest ballet girl, Alison Summers, she performed with Haydn Gwynne, Alex Delamere and Chris Lennon. She then went back two years later and portrayed an older character. In 2007, Kirsty then went into Fiddler on the Roof playing Bielke, at the Savoy Theatre, working closely with Henry Goodman.

== Voiceover career ==
Hickey is the voice of Annie in the UK dub of Little Einsteins on Playhouse Disney.

== Charity work ==
In late 2008, Hickey put together a charity showcase for her church parish, helping to raise funds to build a new church hall for Our Lady Of Lourdes Catholic Church. She also has taken part in many cabarets, performing in front of people such as Bruce Forsyth and The Princess Royal, in aid of raising monies for Save the Children. On 18 September 2010, Hickey performed in front of Pope Benedict XVI at Hyde Park, London to raise money for CAFOD. She also worked alongside the West cliff High School for Boys Charity Week committee in 2013.
