= Hickey (Chinese girl group) =

Chinese girl group

- Origin: China
- Genres: C-pop, hip hop, EDM, pop
- Years active: 2018–present
- Label: Star Master Entertainment
- Members: Jia Xin; Mo Yao; Wen Zhe; An Qi; Ke Lan; Shangguan Xi Ai; Xian Li

Hickey (Chinese: 喜祺) is a girl group under Star Master Entertainment. They debuted on September 14, 2018, with the single "Monkey World". It consists of seven members, Jia Xin, Mo Yao, Wen Zhe, An Qi, Ke Lan, Shangguan Xi Ai, and Xian Li.

== Pre-debut ==
Mo Yao, Wen Zhe, An Qi, and Shangguan Xi Ai participated in the survival show Youth with You 2. An Qi ranked #6 and debuted in The9.

Wen Zhe participated in the survival show Girls Planet 999. She made it to the finale but ultimately did not debut.

== Members ==
- Jia Xin (佳歆) – leader, dancer, vocalist
- Mo Yao (墨谣) – vocalist, rapper
- Wen Zhe (文哲) – main rapper
- An Qi (安崎) – vocalist, dancer
- Ke Lan (可岚) – face of the group, vocalist, dancer
- Shangguan Xi Ai (上官喜爱) – vocalist, rapper
- Xian Li (弦莉) – youngest, vocalist, dancer

== Discography ==
=== Extended play ===
Title	Album details	Sales	Ref
Rose Knight (蔷薇骑士)	Released: December 19, 2019; Language: Mandarin; Label: Star Master Entertainment; Track listing: 1. 蔷薇骑士 (Rose Knight); 2. 说说而已 (No Reason); 3. 另一个她 (The Other Her); 4. 掌心 (Control); 5. 芝麻关门 (Open Sesame)	-	
Ripple (涟漪	Released: October 1, 2020; Language: Mandarin; Label: Star Master Entertainment; Track Listing: 1. 涟漪 (Ripple); 2. 花落知多少; 3. 豆蔻	-	

=== Singles ===
Title	Year	Peak Chart Position	Album
Monkey World	2018	–	Non-Album Single
Fall (沦陷)	2018	–	Non-Album Single
Slow Love (慢慢爱)	2018	–	Non-Album Single
Moonlight (月亮)	2019	–	Non-Album Single
Head Over Heels (神魂颠倒)	2019	–	Non-Album Single
Simply (Gan Cui, 干脆)	2020	–	Non-Album Single
If There Is Still If (如果还有如果)	2020	–	Non-Album Single
Touch (指尖情话)	2020	–	Non-Album Single
You Kiss My Mouth (你吻我的嘴)	2020	–	Non-Album Single
Love War (恋爱预备役)	2020	–	Non-Album Single
Let's Fight, Chinese Youth (奋斗吧，中国少年)	2021	–	Non-Album Single
