= Pentadecahedron =

Polyhedron with 15 faces

Examples of pentadecahedra

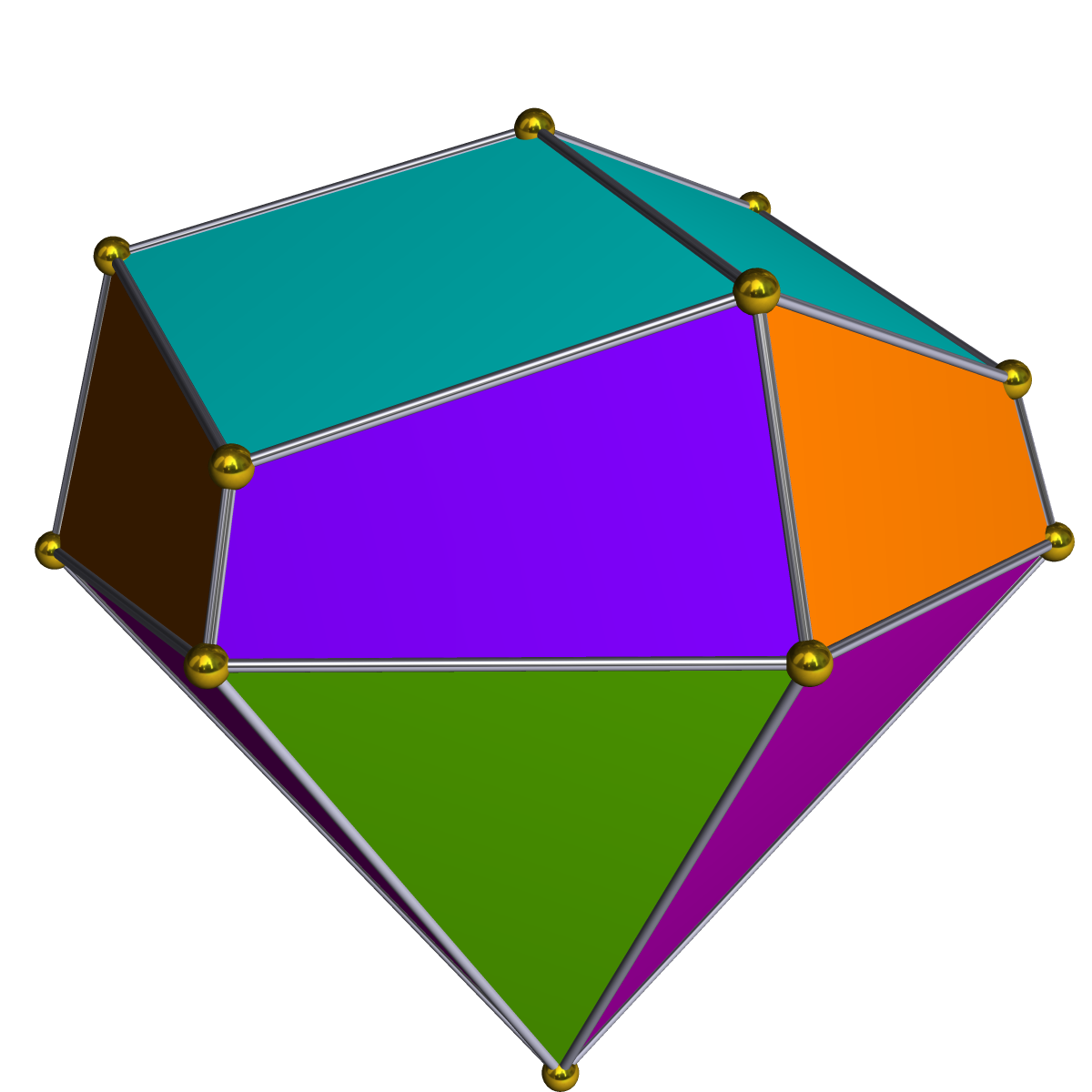
Dual elongated triangular cupola

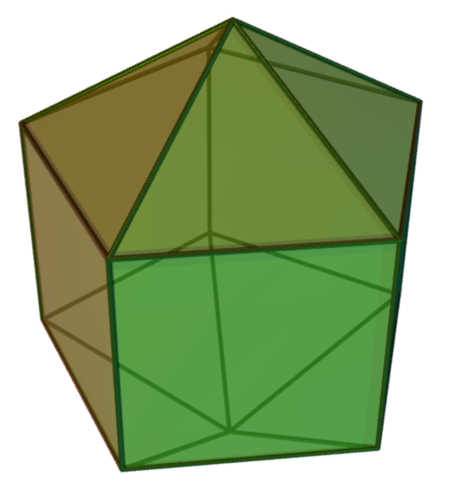
Elongated pentagonal bipyramid

Tridecagonal prism

Elongated heptagonal pyramid

A pentadecahedron (or pentakaidecahedron) is a polyhedron with 15 faces. No pentadecahedron is regular; hence, the name is ambiguous. There are numerous topologically distinct forms of a pentadecahedron, for example the tetradecagonal pyramid, and tridecagonal prism. In the pentadecahedron, none of the shapes are regular polyhedra. In other words, a regular pentadecahedron does not exist, and the pentadecahedron cannot fill space; a space-filling pentadecahedron does not exist.

In chemistry, some clusters of atoms are in the form of pentadecahedra. Calculations have shown that there is a unit cell of the pentadecahedron that is stable in the crystal.

== Convex ==
There are 23,833,988,129 topologically distinct convex pentadecahedra, excluding mirror images, having at least 10 vertices. (Two polyhedra are "topologically distinct" if they have intrinsically different arrangements of faces and vertices, such that it is impossible to distort one into the other simply by changing the lengths of edges or the angles between edges or faces.)

== Common pentadecahedra ==
Name	Type	Image	Symbol	Vertices	Edges	Faces	χ	Face type	Symmetry
Tridecagonal prism	prism		t{2,13} {13}x{}	26	39	15	2	2 tridecagons 13 rectangles	D_{13h}, [13,2], (*13 2 2)
Tetradecagonal pyramid	pyramid		( )∨{14}	15	28	15	2	1 tetradecagon 14 triangles	C_{14v}, [14], (*14 14)
Elongated heptagonal pyramid	pyramid			15	28	15	2	7 triangles 7 rectangles 1 heptagon	D_{7h}, [7,2], (*227), order 28
Truncated heptagonal bipyramid	truncated bipyramid			15	28	15	2	7 triangles 7 trapezoids 1 heptagon	D_{7h}, [7,2], (*227), order 28
Elongated pentagonal bipyramid	Bipyramid; Johnson solid			12	25	15	2	10 triangles 5 squares	D_{5h}, [5,2], (*225)
