= Tetradecagon =

Polygon with 14 edges

Regular tetradecagon
- A regular tetradecagon
- Type: Regular polygon
- Edges and vertices: 14
- Schläfli symbol: {14}, t{7}
- Symmetry group: Dihedral (D_{14}), order 2×14
- Internal angle (degrees): 154+2/7°
- Properties: Convex, cyclic, equilateral, isogonal, isotoxal
- Dual polygon: Self

In geometry, a tetradecagon or tetrakaidecagon or 14-gon is a fourteen-sided polygon.

== Regular tetradecagon ==
A regular tetradecagon is represented by the Schläfli symbol {14} and can be constructed as a quasiregular truncated heptagon, t{7}, which alternates two types of edges.

The area of a regular tetradecagon of side length a is given by

$$A = \frac{14}{4}a^2\cot\frac{\pi}{14} \approx 15.3345a^2$$

=== Construction ===
As 14 = 2 × 7, a regular tetradecagon cannot be constructed using a compass and straightedge. However, it is constructible using neusis with use of the angle trisector, or with a marked ruler, as shown in the following two examples.

Tetradecagon with given circumcircle: An animation (1 min 47 s) from a neusis construction with radius of circumcircle $\overline{OA} = 6$, according to Andrew M. Gleason, based on the angle trisection by means of the tomahawk.

Tetradecagon with given side length: An animation (1 min 20 s) from a neusis construction with marked ruler, according to David Johnson Leisk (Crockett Johnson).

== Symmetry ==
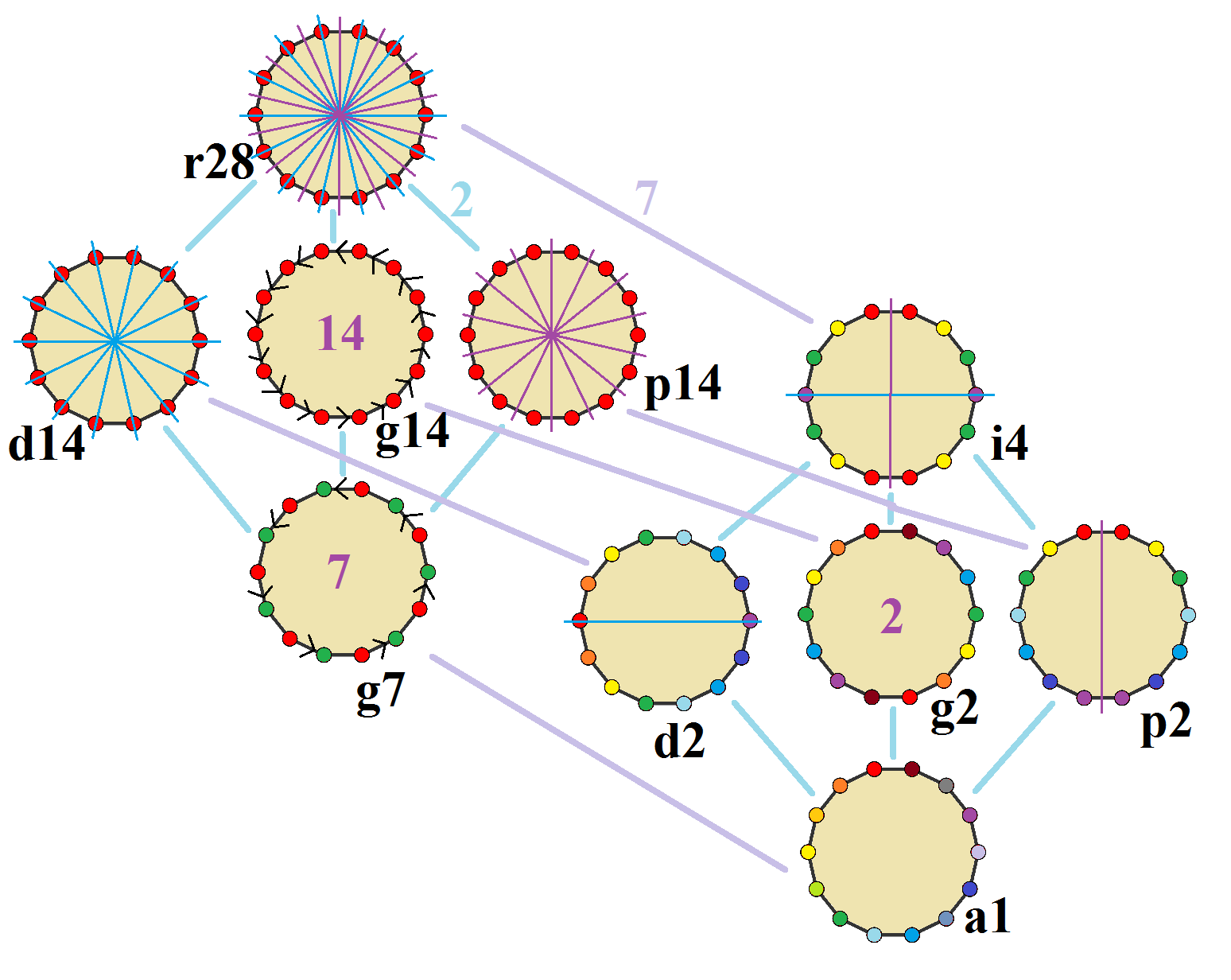
Symmetries of a regular tetradecagon. Vertices are colored by their symmetry positions. Blue mirrors are drawn through vertices, and purple mirrors are drawn through edge. Gyration orders are given in the center.

The regular tetradecagon has Dih_{14} symmetry, order 28. There are 3 subgroup dihedral symmetries: Dih_{7}, Dih_{2}, and Dih_{1}, and 4 cyclic group symmetries: Z_{14}, Z_{7}, Z_{2}, and Z_{1}.

These 8 symmetries can be seen in 10 distinct symmetries on the tetradecagon, a larger number because the lines of reflections can either pass through vertices or edges. John Conway labels these by a letter and group order. Full symmetry of the regular form is r28 and no symmetry is labeled a1. The dihedral symmetries are divided depending on whether they pass through vertices (d for diagonal) or edges (p for perpendiculars), and i when reflection lines path through both edges and vertices. Cyclic symmetries in the middle column are labeled as g for their central gyration orders.

Each subgroup symmetry allows one or more degrees of freedom for irregular forms. Only the g14 subgroup has no degrees of freedom but can be seen as directed edges.

The highest symmetry irregular tetradecagons are d14, an isogonal tetradecagon constructed by seven mirrors which can alternate long and short edges, and p14, an isotoxal tetradecagon, constructed with equal edge lengths, but vertices alternating two different internal angles. These two forms are duals of each other and have half the symmetry order of the regular tetradecagon.

== Dissection ==
| 14-cube projection | 84 rhomb dissection |

Coxeter states that every zonogon (a 2m-gon whose opposite sides are parallel and of equal length) can be dissected into m(m − 1)/2 parallelograms. In particular this is true for regular polygons with evenly many sides, in which case the parallelograms are all rhombi. For the regular tetradecagon, m = 7, and it can be divided into 21: 3 sets of 7 rhombs. This decomposition is based on a Petrie polygon projection of a 7-cube, with 21 of 672 faces. The list OEIS: A006245 defines the number of solutions as 24698, including up to 14-fold rotations and chiral forms in reflection.

Dissection into 21 rhombs

== Numismatic use ==
The regular tetradecagon is used as the shape of some commemorative gold and silver Malaysian coins, the number of sides representing the 14 states of the Malaysian Federation.

== Related figures ==
The flag of Malaysia, featuring a fourteen-pointed star

A tetradecagram is a 14-sided star polygon, represented by symbol {14/n}. There are two regular star polygons: {14/3} and {14/5}, using the same vertices, but connecting every third or fifth points. There are also three compounds: {14/2} is reduced to 2{7} as two heptagons, while {14/4} and {14/6} are reduced to 2{7/2} and 2{7/3} as two different heptagrams, and finally {14/7} is reduced to seven digons.

A notable application of a fourteen-pointed star is in the flag of Malaysia, which incorporates a yellow {14/6} tetradecagram in the top-right corner, representing the unity of the thirteen states with the federal government.

Compounds and star polygons
| n | 1 | 2 | 3 | 4 | 5 | 6 | 7 |
| Form | Regular | Compound | Star polygon | Compound | Star polygon | Compound | |
|---|---|---|---|---|---|---|---|
| Image | {14/1} = {14} | {14/2} = 2{7} | {14/3} | {14/4} = 2{7/2} | {14/5} | {14/6} = 2{7/3} | {14/7} or 7{2} |
| Internal angle | ≈154.286° | ≈128.571° | ≈102.857° | ≈77.1429° | ≈51.4286° | ≈25.7143° | 0° |

Deeper truncations of the regular heptagon and heptagrams can produce isogonal (vertex-transitive) intermediate tetradecagram forms with equally spaced vertices and two edge lengths. Other truncations can form double covering polygons 2{p/q}, namely: t{7/6} = {14/6} = 2{7/3}, t{7/4} = {14/4} = 2{7/2}, and t{7/2} = {14/2} = 2{7}.

Isogonal truncations of heptagon and heptagrams
| Quasiregular | Isogonal | Quasiregular Double covering |
|---|---|---|
| t{7}={14} | | {7/6}={14/6} =2{7/3} |
| t{7/3}={14/3} | | t{7/4}={14/4} =2{7/2} |
| t{7/5}={14/5} | | t{7/2}={14/2} =2{7} |

=== Isotoxal forms ===
An isotoxal polygon can be labeled as {p_{α}} with outer most internal angle α, and a star polygon {(p/q)_{α}}, with q – a winding number, and gcd(p,q) = 1, q < p. Isotoxal tetradecagons have p = 7, and since 7 is prime all solutions, q = 1..6, are polygons.

| {7_{α}} | {(7/2)_{α}} | {(7/3)_{α}} | {(7/4)_{α}} | {(7/5)_{α}} | {(7/6)_{α}} |

=== Petrie polygons ===
Regular skew tetradecagons exist as Petrie polygon for many higher-dimensional polytopes, shown in these skew orthogonal projections, including:

Petrie polygons
| B_{7} | | 2I_{2}(7) (4D) | | |
|---|---|---|---|---|
| 7-orthoplex | 7-cube | 7-7 duopyramid | 7-7 duoprism | |
| A_{13} | D_{8} | | E_{8} | |
| 13-simplex | 5_{11} | 1_{51} | 4_{21} | 2_{41} |
