= Tridecagon =

Polygon with 13 edges

Regular tridecagon
- A regular tridecagon
- Type: Regular polygon
- Edges and vertices: 13
- Schläfli symbol: {13}
- Symmetry group: Dihedral (D_{13}), order 2×13
- Internal angle (degrees): ≈152.308°
- Properties: Convex, cyclic, equilateral, isogonal, isotoxal
- Dual polygon: Self

In geometry, a tridecagon or triskaidecagon or 13-gon is a thirteen-sided polygon.

== Regular tridecagon ==
A regular tridecagon is represented by Schläfli symbol {13}.

The measure of each internal angle of a regular tridecagon is approximately 152.308 degrees, and the area with side length a is given by

$$A = \frac{13}{4}a^2 \cot \frac{\pi}{13} \simeq 13.1858\,a^2.$$

== Construction ==
As 13 is a Pierpont prime but not a Fermat prime, the regular tridecagon cannot be constructed using a compass and straightedge. However, it is constructible using neusis, or angle trisection.

The following is an animation from a neusis construction of a regular tridecagon with radius of circumcircle $\overline{OA} = 12,$ according to Andrew M. Gleason, based on the angle trisection by means of the Tomahawk (light blue).

A neusis construction of a regular tridecagon (triskaidecagon) with radius of circumcircle $\overline{OA} = 12$ as an animation (1 min 44 s), angle trisection by means of the Tomahawk (light blue). This construction is derived from the following equation: $\cos\left(\frac{2\pi}{13}\right)=\frac{1}{12}\left(2\sqrt{26-2\sqrt{13}}\cos\left(\frac{1}{3}\arctan\left(\frac{26+5\sqrt{13}}{9}\right)\right)+\sqrt{13}-1\right).$

== Symmetry ==
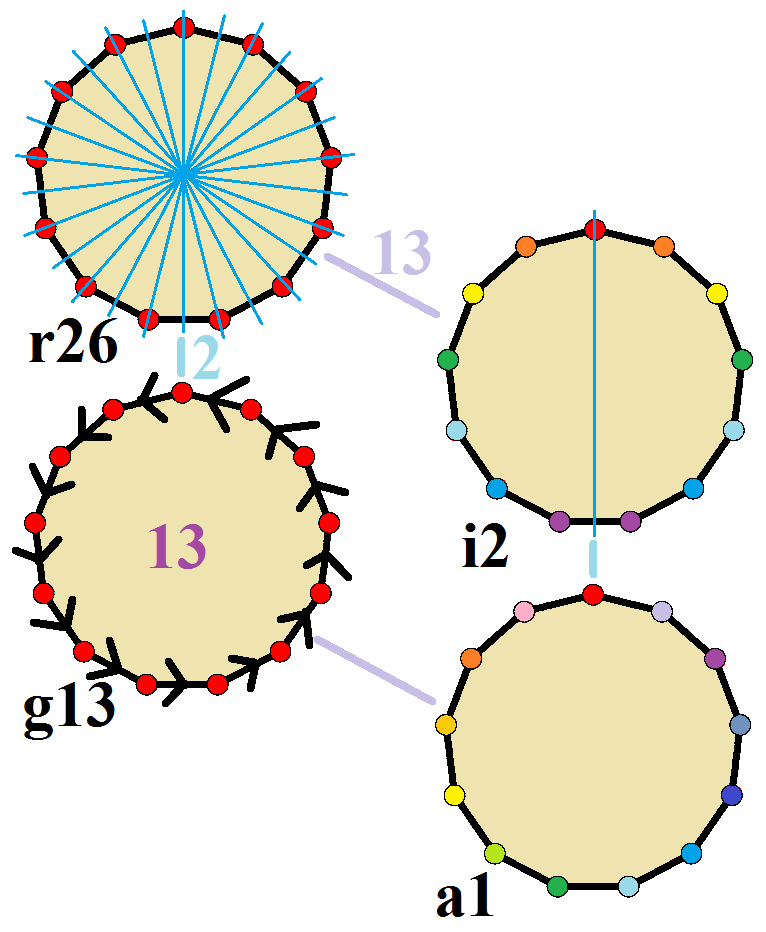
Symmetries of a regular tridecagon. Vertices are colored by their symmetry positions. Blue mirrors are drawn through vertices and edge. Gyration orders are given in the center.

The regular tridecagon has Dih_{13} symmetry, order 26. Since 13 is a prime number there is one subgroup with dihedral symmetry: Dih_{1}, and 2 cyclic group symmetries: Z_{13}, and Z_{1}.

These 4 symmetries can be seen in 4 distinct symmetries on the tridecagon. John Conway labels these by a letter and group order. Full symmetry of the regular form is r26 and no symmetry is labeled a1. The dihedral symmetries are divided depending on whether they pass through vertices (d for diagonal) or edges (p for perpendiculars), and i when reflection lines path through both edges and vertices. Cyclic symmetries in the middle column are labeled as g for their central gyration orders.

Each subgroup symmetry allows one or more degrees of freedom for irregular forms. Only the g13 subgroup has no degrees of freedom but can be seen as directed edges.

== Numismatic use ==
The regular tridecagon is used as the shape of the Czech 20 korun coin.

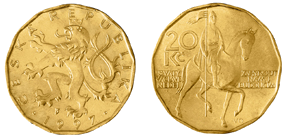

== Related polygons ==
A tridecagram is a 13-sided star polygon. There are 5 regular forms given by Schläfli symbols: {13/2}, {13/3}, {13/4}, {13/5}, and {13/6}. Since 13 is prime, none of the tridecagrams are compound figures.

Tridecagrams
Picture	{13/2}	{13/3}	{13/4}	{13/5}	{13/6}
Internal angle	≈124.615°	≈96.9231°	≈69.2308°	≈41.5385°	≈13.8462°

Although 13-sided stars appear in the Topkapı Scroll, they are not of these regular forms.

=== Petrie polygons ===
The regular tridecagon is the Petrie polygon of the 12-simplex:

A_{12}
12-simplex
