= Neusis construction =

Geometric construction used in Ancient Greek mathematics

Neusis construction

In geometry, the neusis (νεῦσις; from Ancient Greek νεύειν (neuein) 'incline towards'; plural: νεύσεις, neuseis) is a geometric construction method that was used in antiquity by Greek mathematicians.

== Geometric construction ==
The neusis construction consists of fitting a straight line element of given length (a) in between two given (not necessarily straight) lines (l and m), in such a way that the extension of the line element passes through a given point P. That is, one end of the line element has to lie on l and the other end on m while the line element is "inclined" towards P.

Point P is called the pole of the neusis, line l the directrix, or guiding line, and line m the catch line. Length a is called the diastema (Greek: διάστημα, lit. 'distance').

A neusis construction might be performed by means of a marked ruler that is rotatable around the point P (this may be done by putting a pin into the point P and then pressing the ruler against the pin). In the figure one end of the ruler is marked with a yellow eye; this is the origin of the scale division on the ruler. A second marking on the ruler (the blue eye) indicates the distance a from the origin. The yellow eye is moved along line l, until the blue eye coincides with line m.

If we require both lines l and m to be straight lines, then the construction is called line–line neusis. Line–circle neusis and circle–circle neusis are defined analogously. The line–line neusis gives us precisely the power to solve quadratic and cubic (and hence also quartic) equations while line–circle neusis and circle–circle neusis are strictly more powerful than line-line neusis. Technically, any point generated by either the line–circle neusis or the circle–circle neusis lies in an extension field of the rationals that can be reached by a tower of fields in which each adjacent pair has index either 2, 3, 5, or 6 while the adjacent-pair indices over the tower of the extension field of line–line neusis are either 2 or 3.

== Trisection of an angle by line–circle neusis ==
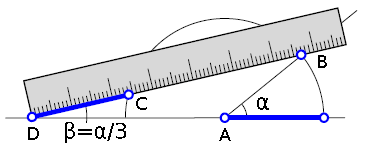
Neusis construction with a ruler to trisect a given angle $\alpha$, blue segments are of equal length and so is the radius of the displayed circle.

Visual proof that the constructed angle $\beta$ is a third of the original angle.

Starting with two lines $\ell_1$ and $\ell_2$ that intersect at angle $\alpha$ (the subject of trisection), let $A$ be the point of intersection and let $B$ be a second point at $\ell_2$. Draw a circle through $B$ centered at $A$. (The directrix will be $\ell_1$ and the catch line the circle.) Place the ruler at line $\ell_2$ and mark it at $A$ and $B$. Keeping the ruler (but not the mark) touching $B$, slide and rotate the ruler so that the mark $A$ touches $\ell_1$, until mark $B$ again touches the circle. Label this point on the circle $C$ and let $D$ be the point where the ruler (and its $A$-mark) touches $\ell_1$. The angle $\beta=ADB$ equals one-third of $\alpha$ (as shown in the visual proof below the illustration of the construction).

== Use of the neusis ==
Neuseis have been important because they sometimes provide a means to solve geometric problems that are not solvable by means of compass and straightedge alone. Examples are the trisection of any angle in three equal parts, and the doubling of the cube. Mathematicians such as Archimedes of Syracuse (287–212 BC) and Pappus of Alexandria (290–350 AD) freely used neuseis; Isaac Newton (1642–1726) followed their line of thought, and also used neusis constructions. Nevertheless, gradually the technique dropped out of use.

=== Regular polygons ===
Suppose that a number x to be constructed lies in a tower of fields over $\Q$,

$$\Q = K_0 \subset K_1 \subset \dots \subset K_n = K.$$

Then a sufficient condition to construct x is that the degree of the extension at each step is no higher than 4. (Note: See Baragar, (1) and Theorem 4.2. Note that including 4 as a possible index or not does not make a difference by Remark after Theorem 5.1.) In 2002, A. Baragar showed a necessary condition for x to be constructible is that the degree of the extension at each step is no higher than 6. (Note: See Baragar, Theorem 5.1.)

Of all prime-power polygons below the 128-gon, this is enough to show that the regular 23-, 29-, 43-, 47-, 49-, 53-, 59-, 67-, 71-, 79-, 83-, 89-, 103-, 107-, 113-, 121-, and 127-gons cannot be constructed with neusis. (If a regular p-gon is constructible, then $\zeta_p = e^\frac{2\pi i}{p}$ is constructible, and in these cases p − 1 has a prime factor higher than 5.) The 3-, 4-, 5-, 6-, 8-, 10-, 12-, 15-, 16-, 17-, 20-, 24-, 30-, 32-, 34-, 40-, 48-, 51-, 60-, 64-, 68-, 80-, 85-, 96-, 102-, 120-, and 128-gons can be constructed with only a straightedge and compass, and the 7-, 9-, 13-, 14-, 18-, 19-, 21-, 26-, 27-, 28-, 35-, 36-, 37-, 38-, 39-, 42-, 52-, 54-, 56-, 57-, 63-, 65-, 70-, 72-, 73-, 74-, 76-, 78-, 81-, 84-, 91-, 95-, 97-, 104-, 105-, 108-, 109-, 111-, 112-, 114-, 117-, 119-, and 126-gons with angle trisection. However, it is not known in general if all quintics (fifth-order polynomials) have neusis-constructible roots, which is relevant for the 11-, 25-, 31-, 41-, 61-, 101-, and 125-gons. Benjamin and Snyder showed in 2014 that the regular 11-gon is neusis-constructible; the 25-, 31-, 41-, 61-, 101-, and 125-gons remain open problems. More generally, the constructibility of all powers of 5 greater than 5 itself by marked ruler and compass is an open problem, along with all primes greater than 11 of the form p = 2^{r}3^{s}5^{t} + 1 where t > 0 (all prime numbers that are greater than 11 and equal to one more than a regular number that is divisible by 10).

=== Squaring the circle ===
Neusis cannot square the circle, as all ratios constructible by neusis are algebraic, while the necessary ratio $\sqrt{\pi}$ is transcendental.

== Waning popularity ==
T. L. Heath, the historian of mathematics, has suggested that the Greek mathematician Oenopides (c. 440 BC) was the first to put compass-and-straightedge constructions above neuseis. The principle to avoid neuseis whenever possible may have been spread by Hippocrates of Chios (c. 430 BC), who originated from the same island as Oenopides, and who was—as far as we know—the first to write a systematically ordered geometry textbook. One hundred years after him Euclid too shunned neuseis in his very influential textbook, The Elements.

The next attack on the neusis came when, from the fourth century BC, Plato's idealism gained ground. Under its influence a hierarchy of three classes of geometrical constructions was developed. Descending from the "abstract and noble" to the "mechanical and earthly", the three classes were:

1. constructions with straight lines and circles only (compass and straightedge);
2. constructions that in addition to this use conic sections (ellipses, parabolas, hyperbolas);
3. constructions that needed yet other means of construction, for example neuseis.

In the end the use of neusis was deemed acceptable only when the two other, higher categories of constructions did not offer a solution. Neusis became a kind of last resort that was invoked only when all other, more respectable, methods had failed. Using neusis where other construction methods might have been used was branded by the late Greek mathematician Pappus of Alexandria (c. 325 AD) as "a not inconsiderable error".

== See also ==
- Alhazen's problem
- Angle trisection
- Constructible polygon
- Mathematics of paper folding
- Pierpont prime
- Tomahawk (geometry)
- Trisectrix
