= Hendecagon =

Shape with eleven sides

Regular hendecagon
- A regular hendecagon
- Type: Regular polygon
- Edges and vertices: 11
- Schläfli symbol: {11}
- Symmetry group: Dihedral (D_{11}), order 2×11
- Internal angle (degrees): ≈147.273°
- Properties: Convex, cyclic, equilateral, isogonal, isotoxal
- Dual polygon: Self

In geometry, a hendecagon (also undecagon or endecagon) or 11-gon is an eleven-sided polygon. (The name hendecagon, from Greek hendeka "eleven" and –gon "corner", is often preferred to the hybrid undecagon, whose first part is formed from Latin undecim "eleven".)

== Regular hendecagon ==
A regular hendecagon is represented by Schläfli symbol {11}.

A regular hendecagon has internal angles of 147.2̅7̅ degrees (=147 $\tfrac{3}{11}$ degrees). The area of a regular hendecagon with side length a is given by

$$A = \frac{11}{4}a^2 \cot \frac{\pi}{11} \simeq 9.36564\,a^2.$$

As 11 is not a Fermat prime, the regular hendecagon is not constructible with compass and straightedge. Because 11 is not a Pierpont prime, construction of a regular hendecagon is still impossible even with the usage of an angle trisector.

Close approximations to the regular hendecagon can be constructed. For instance, the ancient Greek mathematicians approximated the side length of a hendecagon inscribed in a unit circle as being 14/25 units long.

The hendecagon can be constructed exactly via neusis construction and also via two-fold origami.

== Approximate construction ==
Hendecagon inscribed in a circle, a continuation of the basic construction according to T. Drummond as animation.
Corresponds to the copper engraving by Anton Ernst Burkhard of Birckenstein.

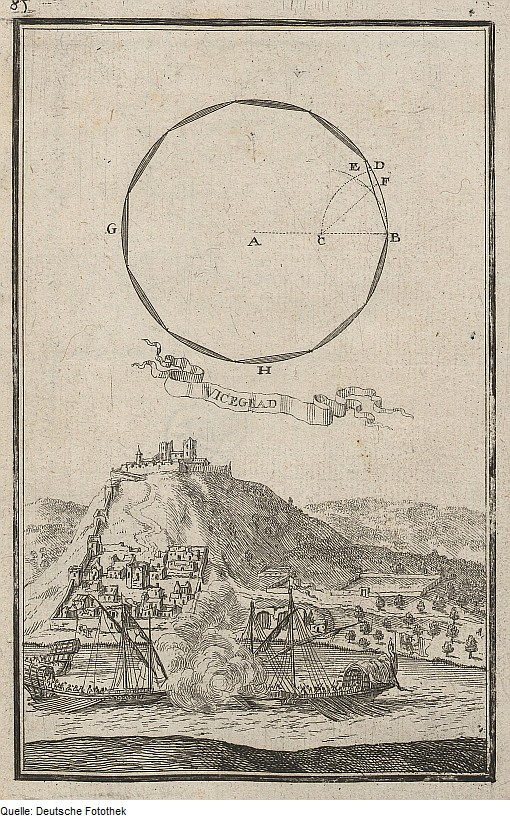
Hendecagon, copper engraving by 1698 by Anton Ernst Burkhard of Birckenstein. (Showing approximate straightedge-and-compass construction; unrelated ornamental illustration of Visegrád, Hungary, filling the whitespace below).

The following construction description is given by T. Drummond from 1800:

Draw the radius A B, bisect it in C—with an opening of the compasses equal to half the radius, upon A and C as centres describe the arcs C D I and A D—with the distance I D upon I describe the arc D O and draw the line C O, which will be the extent of one side of a hendecagon sufficiently exact for practice.

On a unit circle:

- Constructed hendecagon side length $b=0.563692\ldots$
- Theoretical hendecagon side length $a=2\sin(\frac{\pi}{11})=0.563465\ldots$
- Absolute error $\delta=b-a=2.27\ldots\cdot10^{-4}$ – if A̅B̅ is 10 m then this error is approximately 2.3 mm.

== Symmetry ==
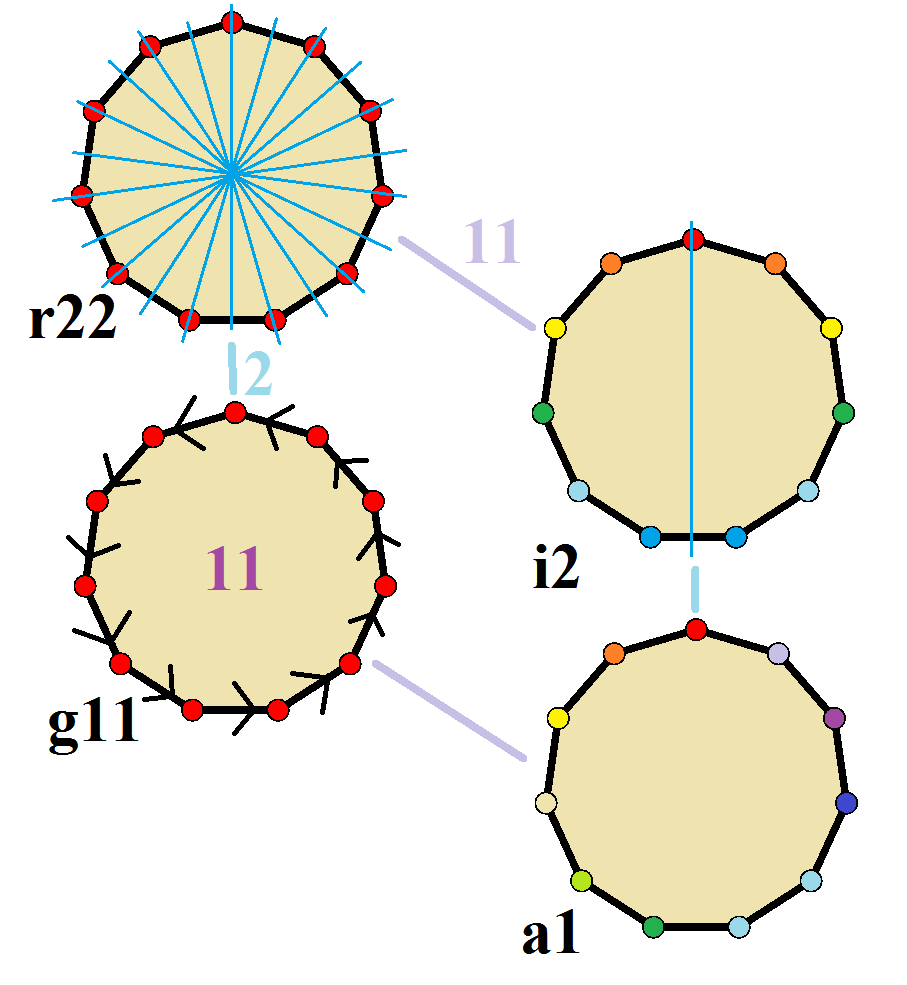
Symmetries of a regular hendecagon. Vertices are colored by their symmetry positions. Blue mirror lines are drawn through vertices and edge. Gyration orders are given in the center.

The regular hendecagon has Dih_{11} symmetry, order 22. Since 11 is a prime number there is one subgroup with dihedral symmetry: Dih_{1}, and 2 cyclic group symmetries: Z_{11}, and Z_{1}.

These 4 symmetries can be seen in 4 distinct symmetries on the hendecagon. John Conway labels these by a letter and group order. Full symmetry of the regular form is r22 and no symmetry is labeled a1. The dihedral symmetries are divided depending on whether they pass through vertices (d for diagonal) or edges (p for perpendiculars), and i when reflection lines path through both edges and vertices. Cyclic symmetries in the middle column are labeled as g for their central gyration orders.

Each subgroup symmetry allows one or more degrees of freedom for irregular forms. Only the g11 subgroup has no degrees of freedom but can be seen as directed edges.

== Use in coinage ==
The Canadian dollar coin, the loonie, is similar to, but not exactly, a regular hendecagonal prism, as are the Indian 2-rupee coin and several other lesser-used coins of other nations. The cross-section of a loonie is actually a Reuleaux hendecagon. The United States Susan B. Anthony dollar has a hendecagonal outline along the inside of its edges.

== Related figures ==
The hendecagon shares the same set of 11 vertices with four regular hendecagrams:

{11/2}	{11/3}	{11/4}	{11/5}

== See also ==
- 10-simplex - can be seen as a complete graph in a regular hendecagonal orthogonal projection
