= Heptagon =

Shape with seven sides

Regular heptagon
- A regular heptagon
- Type: Regular polygon
- Edges and vertices: 7
- Schläfli symbol: {7}
- Symmetry group: Dihedral (D_{7}), order 2×7
- Internal angle (degrees): ≈128.571°
- Properties: Convex, cyclic, equilateral, isogonal, isotoxal
- Dual polygon: Self

In geometry, a heptagon is a seven-sided polygon or 7-gon.

The heptagon is sometimes referred to as the septagon, using septa- (an elision of septua-), a Latin-derived numerical prefix, rather than hepta-, a Greek-derived numerical prefix (both are cognate), together with the suffix -gon for Greek: γωνἰα, romanized: gonía, meaning angle.

== Regular heptagon ==
A regular heptagon, in which all sides and all angles are equal, has internal angles of $\tfrac57\pi$ radians ($128\,\tfrac47$ degrees). Its Schläfli symbol is {7}.

=== Area ===
The area (A) of a regular heptagon of side length a is given by:

$$A = \tfrac{7}{4}a^2 \cot \tfrac17\pi \simeq 3.634 a^2.$$

This can be seen by subdividing the unit-sided heptagon into seven triangular "pie slices" with vertices at the center and at the heptagon's vertices, and then halving each triangle using the apothem as the common side. The apothem is half the cotangent of $\tfrac17\pi$, and the area of each of the 14 small triangles is one-fourth of the apothem.

The area of a regular heptagon inscribed in a circle of radius R is $\tfrac72 R^2\sin\tfrac27\pi,$ while the area of the circle itself is $\pi R^2;$ thus the regular heptagon fills approximately 0.8710 of its circumscribed circle.

=== Construction ===
As 7 is a Pierpont prime but not a Fermat prime, the regular heptagon is not constructible with compass and straightedge but is constructible with a marked ruler and compass. It is the smallest regular polygon with this property. This type of construction is called a neusis construction. It is also constructible with compass, straightedge and angle trisector. The impossibility of straightedge and compass construction follows from the observation that $2\cos\tfrac27\pi \approx 1.247$ is a zero of the irreducible cubic x^{3} + x^{2} − 2x − 1. Consequently, this polynomial is the minimal polynomial of $2\cos \tfrac27\pi$, whereas the degree of the minimal polynomial for a constructible number must be a power of 2.

A neusis construction of the interior angle in a regular heptagon.	An animation from a neusis construction with radius of circumcircle $\overline{OA} = 6$, according to Andrew M. Gleason based on the angle trisection by means of the tomahawk. This construction relies on the fact that $\cos\left(\tfrac{2\pi}{7}\right) = \tfrac{1}{6}\left(2\sqrt{7}\cos\left(\tfrac{1}{3}\arctan 3\sqrt{3}~\right)-1\right).$

Heptagon with given side length: An animation from a neusis construction with marked ruler, according to David Johnson Leisk (Crockett Johnson).

=== Approximation ===
An approximation for practical use with an error of about 0.2% is to use half the side of an equilateral triangle inscribed in the same circle as the length of the side of a regular heptagon. It is unknown who first found this approximation, but it was mentioned by Heron of Alexandria's Metrica in the 1st century AD, was well known to medieval Islamic mathematicians, and can be found in the work of Albrecht Dürer. Let A lie on the circumference of the circumcircle. Draw arc BOC. Then $\textstyle {BD = \tfrac12 BC}$ gives an approximation for the edge of the heptagon.

This approximation uses $\textstyle \tfrac12\sqrt{3} \approx 0.86603$ for the side of the heptagon inscribed in the unit circle while the exact value is $\textstyle 2\sin\tfrac17\pi \approx 0.86777$.

Example to illustrate the error: At a circumscribed circle radius r = 1 m, the absolute error of the first side would be approximately −1.7 mm

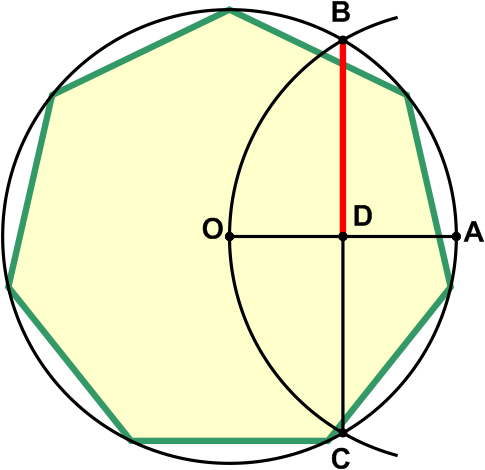

=== Other approximations ===
There are other approximations of a heptagon using compass and straightedge, but they are time-consuming to draw.

=== Symmetry ===
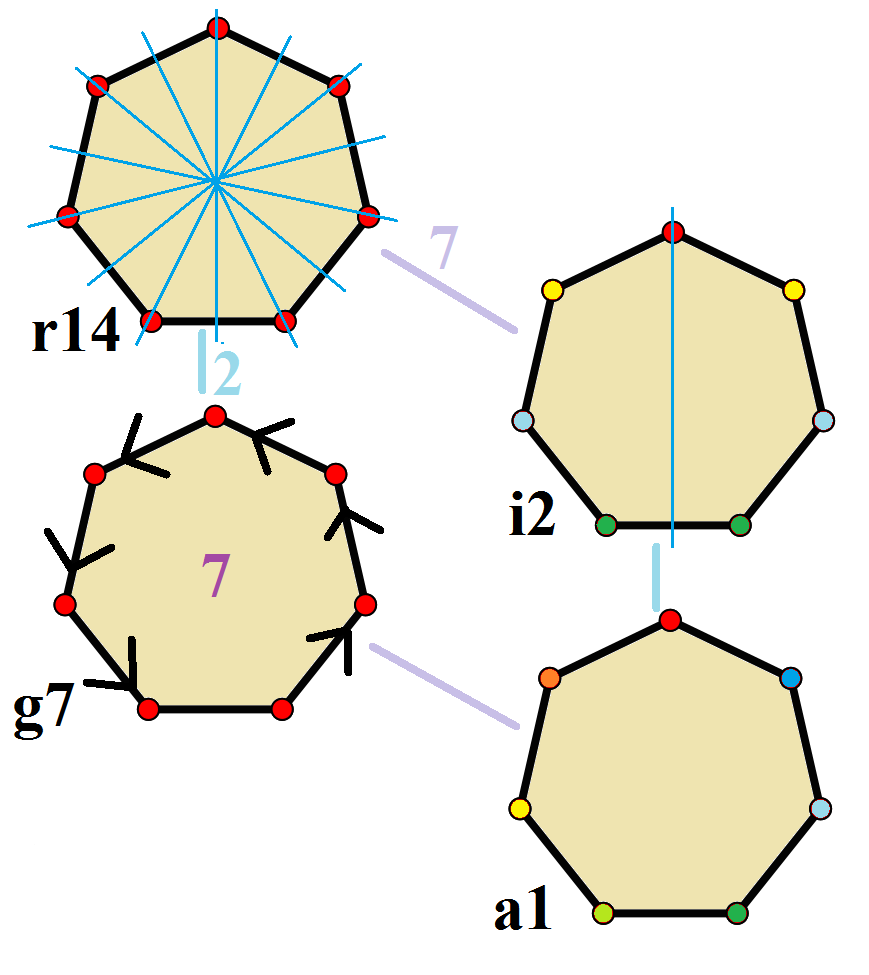
Symmetries of a regular heptagon. Vertices are colored by their symmetry positions. Blue mirror lines are drawn through vertices and edges. Gyration orders are given in the center.

The regular heptagon belongs to the D_{7h} point group (Schoenflies notation), order 28. The symmetry elements are: a 7-fold proper rotation axis C_{7}, a 7-fold improper rotation axis, S_{7}, 7 vertical mirror planes, σ_{v}, 7 2-fold rotation axes, C_{2}, in the plane of the heptagon and a horizontal mirror plane, σ_{h}, also in the heptagon's plane.

=== Diagonals and heptagonal triangle ===
a=red, b=blue, c=green lines

The regular heptagon's side a, shorter diagonal b, and longer diagonal c, with a<b<c, satisfy

$$a^2=c(c-b),$$
$$b^2 =a(c+a),$$
$$c^2 =b(a+b),$$
$\frac{1}{a}=\frac{1}{b}+\frac{1}{c}$ (the optic equation)

and hence

$$ab+ac=bc,$$

and

$$b^3+2b^2c-bc^2-c^3=0,$$
$$c^3-2c^2a-ca^2+a^3=0,$$
$$a^3-2a^2b-ab^2+b^3=0,$$

Thus –b/c, c/a, and a/b all satisfy the cubic equation $t^3-2t^2-t + 1=0.$ However, no algebraic expressions with purely real terms exist for the solutions of this equation, because it is an example of casus irreducibilis.

The approximate lengths of the diagonals in terms of the side of the regular heptagon are given by

$$b\approx 1.80193\cdot a, \qquad c\approx 2.24698\cdot a.$$

We also have

$$b^2-a^2=ac,$$

$$c^2-b^2=ab,$$

$$a^2-c^2=-bc,$$

and

$$\frac{b^2}{a^2}+\frac{c^2}{b^2}+\frac{a^2}{c^2}=5.$$

A heptagonal triangle has vertices coinciding with the first, second, and fourth vertices of a regular heptagon (from an arbitrary starting vertex) and angles $\tfrac17\pi$, $\tfrac27\pi$, and $\tfrac47\pi$. Thus its sides coincide with one side and two particular diagonals of the regular heptagon.

=== In polyhedra ===
Apart from the heptagonal prism and heptagonal antiprism, no convex polyhedron made entirely out of regular polygons contains a heptagon as a face.

== Star heptagons ==
Two kinds of star heptagons (heptagrams) can be constructed from regular heptagons, labeled by Schläfli symbols {7/2}, and {7/3}, with the divisor being the interval of connection.

Blue, {7/2} and green {7/3} star heptagons inside a red heptagon.

== Tiling and packing ==
Triangle, heptagon, and 42-gon vertex

Hyperbolic heptagon tiling

A regular triangle, heptagon, and 42-gon can completely fill a plane vertex. However, there is no tiling of the plane with only these polygons, because there is no way to fit one of them onto the third side of the triangle without leaving a gap or creating an overlap. In the hyperbolic plane, tilings by regular heptagons are possible. There are also concave heptagon tilings possible in the Euclidean plane.

The densest double lattice packing of the Euclidean plane by regular heptagons, conjectured to have the lowest maximum packing density of any convex set

The regular heptagon has a double lattice packing of the Euclidean plane of packing density approximately 0.89269. This has been conjectured to be the lowest density possible for the optimal double lattice packing density of any convex set, and more generally for the optimal packing density of any convex set.

== Empirical examples ==
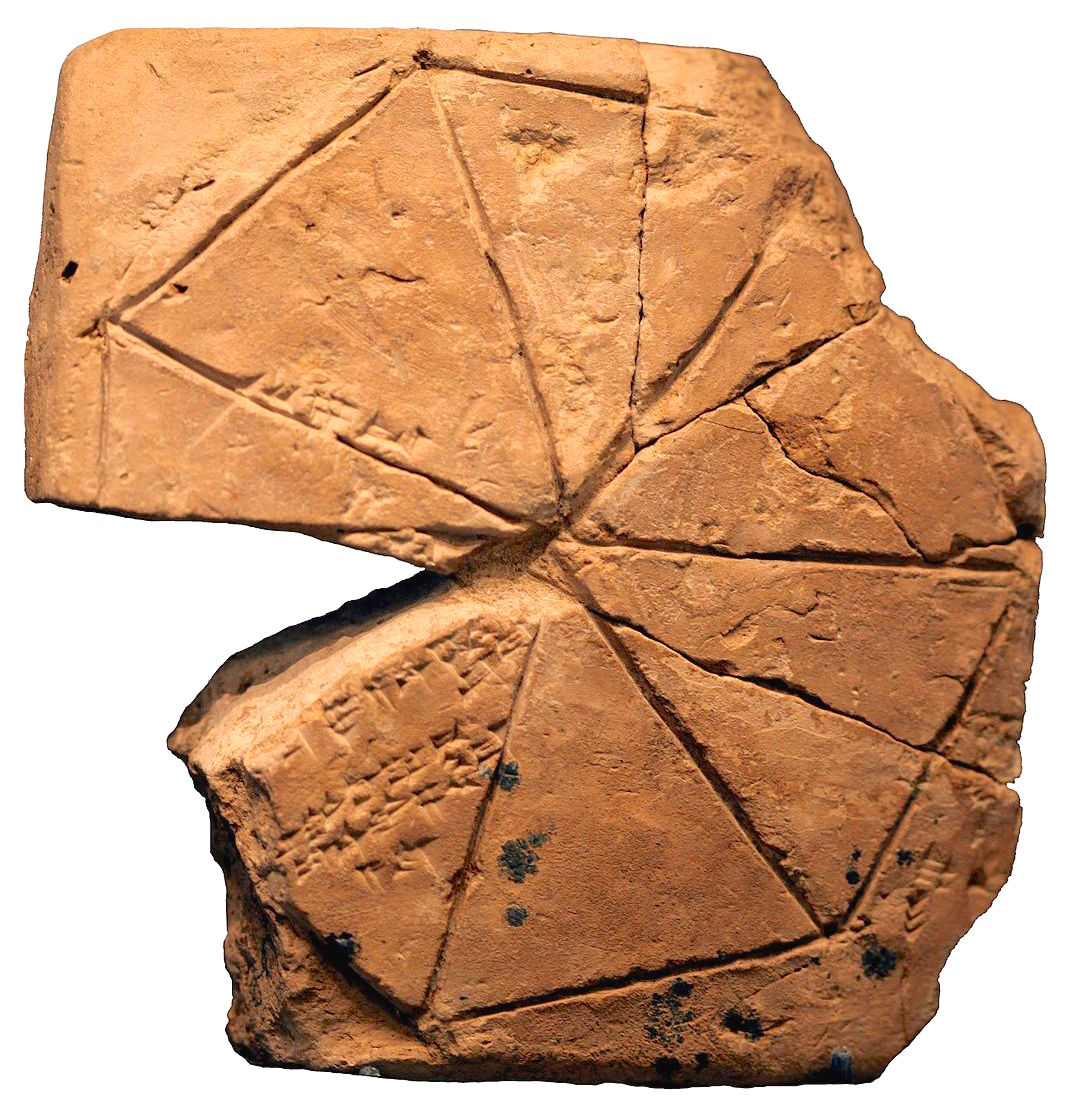
Heptagon divided into triangles, clay tablet from Susa, 2nd millennium BCE

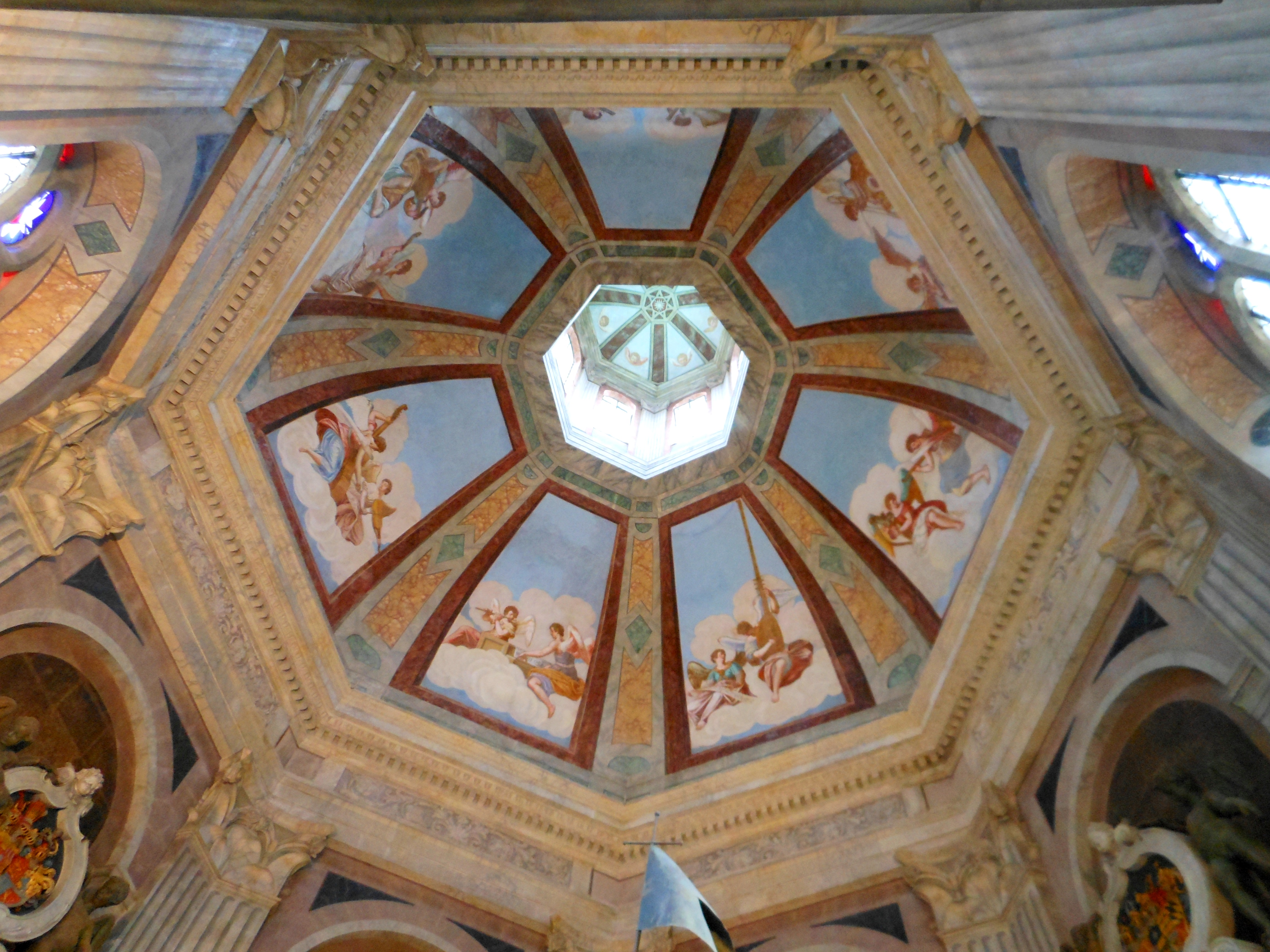
Heptagonal dome of the Mausoleum of Prince Ernst

Some 1000-kwacha coins from Zambia have been minted as heptagons.

Many states use a Reuleaux heptagon, a curve of constant width, for some of their coins; the sides are curved outwards to allow the coins to roll smoothly when they are inserted into a vending machine. These include:

- United Kingdom fifty pence and twenty pence (and corresponding coins in Jersey, Guernsey, Isle of Man, Gibraltar, Falkland Islands and Saint Helena)
- Barbadian Dollar
- Botswana pula (2 Pula, 1 Pula, 50 Thebe and 5 Thebe
- Mauritius
- U.A.E.
- Tanzania
- Samoa
- Papua New Guinea
- São Tomé and Príncipe
- Haiti
- Jamaica
- Liberia
- Ghana
- the Gambia
- Jordan
- Guyana
- Solomon Islands

The Brazilian 25-cent coin has a heptagon inscribed in the coin's disk. Some old versions of the coat of arms of Georgia, including in Soviet days, used a {7/2} heptagram as an element.

A number of coins, including the 20 euro cent coin, have heptagonal symmetry in a shape called the Spanish flower.

In architecture, examples of heptagonal buildings include the Mausoleum of Prince Ernst in Stadthagen, Germany; the Maltz Performing Arts Center (formerly Temple Tifereth-Israel) in Cleveland; and Wallace Presbyterian Church in College Park, Maryland.

== See also ==
- Heptagram
- Polygon
