= Vincenzo Mollame =

Italian mathematician

Vincenzo Mollame (Naples, Kingdom of the Two Sicilies 4 July 1848 – Catania, 23 June 1912) was an Italian mathematician.

Mollame was privately tutored by Achille Sanni and then studied Mathematics at the University of Naples Federico II. After obtaining his degree, he became a high-school teacher, first at Benevento and after that at Naples, starting in 1878. He became a professor at the University of Catania in 1880 and remained there for the rest of his career, having retired in 1911, a few months before his death.

His research area was the theory of equations, and he proved in 1890 that when a cubic polynomial with rational coefficients has three real roots but it is irreducible in Q[x] (the so-called casus irreducibilis), then the roots cannot be expressed from the coefficients using real radicals alone, that is, complex non-real numbers must be involved if one expresses the roots from the coefficients using radicals, probably unaware of the fact that Pierre Wantzel had already proved it in 1843. Molleme's research activity stopped in 1896, due to health problems.

Mollame was the author of a textbook on determinants.
