= Double lattice =

Discrete subgroup in geometry

In mathematics, especially in geometry, a double lattice in ℝ^{n} is a discrete subgroup of the group of Euclidean motions that consists only of translations and point reflections and such that the subgroup of translations is a lattice. The orbit of any point under the action of a double lattice is a union of two Bravais lattices, related to each other by a point reflection. A double lattice in two dimensions is a p2 wallpaper group. In three dimensions, a double lattice is a space group of the type 1̅, as denoted by international notation.

== Double lattice packing ==
The best known packing of equal-sized regular pentagons on a plane is a double lattice structure which covers 92.131% of the plane.

A packing that can be described as the orbit of a body under the action of a double lattice is called a double lattice packing. In many cases the highest known packing density for a body is achieved by a double lattice. Examples include the regular pentagon, heptagon, and nonagon and the equilateral triangular bipyramid. Włodzimierz Kuperberg and Greg Kuperberg showed that all convex planar bodies can pack at a density of at least √3/2 by using a double lattice.

In a preprint released in 2016, Thomas Hales and Wöden Kusner announced a proof that the double lattice packing of the regular pentagon has the optimal density among all packings of regular pentagons in the plane. This packing has been used as a decorative pattern in China since at least 1900, and in this context has been called the "pentagonal ice-ray". As of 2021, the proof of its optimality has not yet been refereed and published.

It has been conjectured that, among all convex shapes, the regular heptagon has the lowest packing density for its optimal double lattice packing, but this remains unproven.
