= Pierre Wantzel =

French mathematician (1814–1848)

Pierre Laurent Wantzel
- Born: 5 June 1814; Paris, France
- Died: 21 May 1848 (aged 33); Paris, France
- Known for: Solving several ancient Greek geometry problems
- Scientific career
- Fields: Mathematics, geometry

Pierre Laurent Wantzel (5 June 1814 – 21 May 1848) was a French mathematician who proved that several ancient geometric problems were impossible to solve using only compass and straightedge.

In a paper from 1837, Wantzel proved that the problems of doubling the cube and trisecting the angle are impossible to solve if one uses only a compass and straightedge. In the same paper he also solved the problem of determining which regular polygons are constructible: a regular polygon is constructible if and only if the number of its sides is the product of a power of two and any number of distinct Fermat primes (i.e., the sufficient conditions given by Carl Friedrich Gauss are also necessary).

The solution to these problems had been sought for thousands of years, particularly by the ancient Greeks. However, Wantzel's work was neglected by his contemporaries, being virtually uncelebrated at the time of publishing, and was essentially forgotten. Indeed, it was only 50 years after its publication that Wantzel's article was mentioned either in a journal article or in a textbook. Before that, it seems to have been mentioned only once, by Julius Petersen, in his doctoral thesis of 1871. It was probably due to an article published about Wantzel by Florian Cajori more than 80 years after the publication of Wantzel's article that his name started to be well known among mathematicians.

Wantzel was also the first person to prove, in 1843, that if a cubic polynomial with rational coefficients has three real roots but is irreducible in Q[x] (the so-called casus irreducibilis), then the roots cannot be expressed from the coefficients using real radicals alone; that is, complex non-real numbers must be involved if one expresses the roots from the coefficients using radicals. This theorem would be rediscovered decades later by (and sometimes attributed to) Vincenzo Mollame and Otto Hölder.

Ordinarily he worked evenings, not lying down until late; then he read, and took only a few hours of troubled sleep, making alternately wrong use of coffee and opium, and taking his meals at irregular hours until he was married. He put unlimited trust in his constitution, very strong by nature, which he taunted at pleasure by all sorts of abuse. He brought sadness to those who mourn his premature death.

— Adhémar Jean Claude Barré de Saint-Venant, on the occasion of Wantzel's death.

Wantzel is often overlooked for his contributions to mathematics. In fact, for over a century there was great confusion as to who proved the impossibility theorems.

Wantzel died at just 33 years old, which historical accounts attribute to an overuse of caffeine, opium, and occupational burnout.
