= Pierpont prime =

Prime number of the form 2^u × 3^v + 1

- Named after: James Pierpont
- No. of known terms: Thousands
- Conjectured no. of terms: Infinite
- Subsequence of: Pierpont number
- First terms: 2, 3, 5, 7, 13, 17, 19, 37, 73, 97, 109, 163, 193, 257, 433, 487, 577, 769, 1153, 1297, 1459, 2593, 2917, 3457, 3889
- Largest known term: 81 × 2^{20,498,148} + 1
- OEIS index: A005109

In number theory, a Pierpont prime is a prime number of the form
$$2^u\cdot 3^v + 1\,$$
for some nonnegative integers u and v. That is, they are the prime numbers p for which p − 1 is 3-smooth. They are named after the mathematician James Pierpont, who used them to characterize the regular polygons that can be constructed using conic sections. The same characterization applies to polygons that can be constructed using ruler, compass, and angle trisector, or using paper folding.

Except for 2 and the Fermat primes, every Pierpont prime must be 1 modulo 6. The first few Pierpont primes are:

2, 3, 5, 7, 13, 17, 19, 37, 73, 97, 109, 163, 193, 257, 433, 487, 577, 769, 1153, 1297, 1459, 2593, 2917, 3457, 3889, 10369, 12289, 17497, 18433, 39367, 52489, 65537, 139969, 147457, 209953, 331777, 472393, 629857, 746497, 786433, 839809, 995329, ... (sequence A005109 in the OEIS)

It has been conjectured that there are infinitely many Pierpont primes, but this remains unproven.

== Distribution ==
Unsolved problem in mathematics
Are there infinitely many Pierpont primes?
More unsolved problems in mathematics

A Pierpont prime with v = 0 is of the form $2^u+1$, and is therefore a Fermat prime (unless u = 0). If v is positive then u must also be positive (because $3^v+1$ would be an even number greater than 2 and therefore not prime), and therefore the non-Fermat Pierpont primes all have the form 6k + 1, when k is a positive integer (except for 2, when u = v = 0).

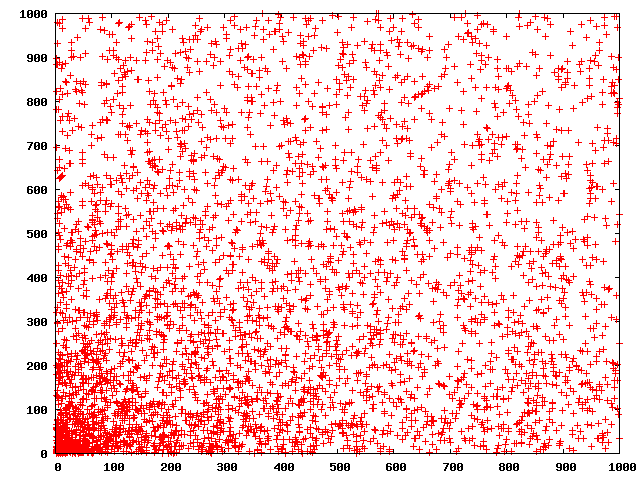
Distribution of the exponents for the smaller Pierpont primes

Empirically, the Pierpont primes do not seem to be particularly rare or sparsely distributed; there are 42 Pierpont primes less than 10^{6}, 65 less than 10^{9}, 157 less than 10^{20}, and 795 less than 10^{100}. There are few restrictions from algebraic factorisations on the Pierpont primes, so there are no requirements like the Mersenne prime condition that the exponent must be prime. Thus, it is expected that among n-digit numbers of the correct form $2^u\cdot3^v+1$, the fraction of these that are prime should be proportional to 1/n, a similar proportion as the proportion of prime numbers among all n-digit numbers. As there are $\Theta(n^{2})$ numbers of the correct form in this range, there should be $\Theta(n)$ Pierpont primes.

Andrew M. Gleason made this reasoning explicit, conjecturing there are infinitely many Pierpont primes, and more specifically that there should be approximately 9n Pierpont primes up to 10^{n}. According to Gleason's conjecture there are $\Theta(\log N)$ Pierpont primes smaller than N, as opposed to the smaller conjectural number $O(\log \log N)$ of Mersenne primes in that range.

== Primality testing ==
When $2^u > 3^v$, $2^u\cdot 3^v + 1$ is a Proth number and thus its primality can be tested by Proth's theorem. On the other hand, when $2^u < 3^v$ alternative primality tests for $M=2^u\cdot 3^v + 1$ are possible based on the factorization of $M-1$ as a small even number multiplied by a large power of 3.

== Pierpont primes found as factors of Fermat numbers ==
As part of the ongoing worldwide search for factors of Fermat numbers, some Pierpont primes have been announced as factors. The following table gives values of m, k, and n such that

$2^{2^m} + 1$ is divisible by $3^{k} \cdot 2^{n} + 1.$

The left-hand side is a Fermat number; the right-hand side is a Pierpont prime.

m	k	n	Year	Discoverer
38	1	41	1903	Cullen, Cunningham & Western
63	2	67	1956	Robinson
207	1	209	1956	Robinson
452	3	455	1956	Robinson
9428	2	9431	1983	Keller
12185	4	12189	1993	Dubner
28281	4	28285	1996	Taura
157167	1	157169	1995	Young
213319	1	213321	1996	Young
303088	1	303093	1998	Young
382447	1	382449	1999	Cosgrave & Gallot
461076	2	461081	2003	Nohara, Jobling, Woltman & Gallot
495728	5	495732	2007	Keiser, Jobling, Penné & Fougeron
672005	3	672007	2005	Cooper, Jobling, Woltman & Gallot
2145351	1	2145353	2003	Cosgrave, Jobling, Woltman & Gallot
2478782	1	2478785	2003	Cosgrave, Jobling, Woltman & Gallot
2543548	2	2543551	2011	Brown, Reynolds, Penné & Fougeron
7963245	3	7963247	2021	Greer, Reynolds, Penné & Fougeron

As of 2023, the largest known Pierpont prime is 81 × 2^{20498148} + 1 (6,170,560 decimal digits), whose primality was discovered in June 2023.

== Polygon construction ==
In the mathematics of paper folding, the Huzita axioms define six of the seven types of fold possible. It has been shown that these folds are sufficient to allow the construction of the points that solve any cubic equation. It follows that they allow any regular polygon of N sides to be formed, as long as N ≥ 3 and is of the form 2^{m}3^{n}ρ, where ρ is a product of distinct Pierpont primes. This is the same class of regular polygons as those that can be constructed with a compass, straightedge, and angle trisector. Regular polygons which can be constructed with only compass and straightedge (constructible polygons) are the special case where n = 0 and ρ is a product of distinct Fermat primes, themselves a subset of Pierpont primes.

In 1895, James Pierpont studied the same class of regular polygons; his work is what gives the name to the Pierpont primes. Pierpont generalized compass and straightedge constructions in a different way, by adding the ability to draw conic sections whose coefficients come from previously constructed points. As he showed, the regular N-gons that can be constructed with these operations are the ones such that the totient of N is 3-smooth. Since the totient of a prime is formed by subtracting one from it, the primes N for which Pierpont's construction works are exactly the Pierpont primes. However, Pierpont did not describe the form of the composite numbers with 3-smooth totients. As Gleason later showed, these numbers are exactly the ones of the form 2^{m}3^{n}ρ given above.

The smallest prime that is not a Pierpont (or Fermat) prime is 11; therefore, the hendecagon is the first regular polygon that cannot be constructed with compass, straightedge and angle trisector (or origami, or conic sections). However, Benjamin and Snyder showed in 2014 that the regular 11-gon is neusis-constructible. All other regular N-gons with 3 ≤ N ≤ 21 can be constructed with compass, straightedge and trisector.

== Generalization ==
A Pierpont prime of the second kind is a prime number of the form 2^{u}3^{v} − 1. These numbers are

2, 3, 5, 7, 11, 17, 23, 31, 47, 53, 71, 107, 127, 191, 383, 431, 647, 863, 971, 1151, 2591, 4373, 6143, 6911, 8191, 8747, 13121, 15551, 23327, 27647, 62207, 73727, 131071, 139967, 165887, 294911, 314927, 442367, 472391, 497663, 524287, 786431, 995327, ... (sequence A005105 in the OEIS)

The largest known primes of this type are Mersenne primes; currently the largest known is $2^{136279841}-1$ (41,024,320 decimal digits). The largest known Pierpont prime of the second kind that is not a Mersenne prime is $3\cdot 2^{22103376}-1$, found by PrimeGrid.

A generalized Pierpont prime is a prime of the form $p_1^{n_1} \!\cdot p_2^{n_2} \!\cdot p_3^{n_3} \!\cdot \ldots \cdot p_k^{n_k} + 1$ with k fixed primes p_{1} < p_{2} < p_{3} < ... < p_{k}. A generalized Pierpont prime of the second kind is a prime of the form $p_1^{n_1} \!\cdot p_2^{n_2} \!\cdot p_3^{n_3} \!\cdot \ldots \cdot p_k^{n_k} - 1$ with k fixed primes p_{1} < p_{2} < p_{3} < ... < p_{k}. Since all primes greater than 2 are odd, in both kinds p_{1} must be 2. The sequences of such primes in the OEIS are:

{p_{1}, p_{2}, p_{3}, ..., p_{k}}	+ 1	− 1
{2}	(sequence A092506 in the OEIS)	(sequence A000668 in the OEIS)
{2, 3}	(sequence A005109 in the OEIS)	(sequence A005105 in the OEIS)
{2, 5}	(sequence A077497 in the OEIS)	(sequence A077313 in the OEIS)
{2, 3, 5}	(sequence A002200 in the OEIS)	(sequence A293194 in the OEIS)
{2, 7}	(sequence A077498 in the OEIS)	(sequence A077314 in the OEIS)
{2, 3, 5, 7}	(sequence A174144 in the OEIS)	(sequence A347977 in the OEIS)
{2, 11}	(sequence A077499 in the OEIS)	(sequence A077315 in the OEIS)
{2, 13}	(sequence A173236 in the OEIS)	(sequence A173062 in the OEIS)

== See also ==
- Proth prime, the primes of the form $N = k \cdot 2^n + 1$ where k and n are positive integers, $k$ is odd and $2^n > k.$
