= Angle trisection =

Construction of an angle equal to one third a given angle

Angles may be trisected via a neusis construction using tools beyond an unmarked straightedge and a compass. The example shows trisection of any angle θ > 3π/4 by a ruler with length equal to the radius of the circle, giving trisected angle φ = θ/3.

Angle trisection is the construction of an angle equal to one third of a given arbitrary angle, using only two tools: an unmarked straightedge and a compass. It is a classical problem of straightedge and compass construction of ancient Greek mathematics.

In 1837, Pierre Wantzel proved that the problem, as stated, is impossible to solve for arbitrary angles. However, some special angles can be trisected: for example, it is trivial to trisect a right angle or an angle of 135 degrees, because a 30-60-90 triangle and an isosceles right triangle are constructible, respectively.

It is possible to trisect an arbitrary angle by using tools other than straightedge and compass. For example, neusis construction, also known to ancient Greeks, involves simultaneous sliding and rotation of a marked straightedge, which cannot be achieved with the original tools. Other techniques were developed by mathematicians over the centuries.

Because it is defined in simple terms, but complex to prove unsolvable, the problem of angle trisection is a frequent subject of pseudomathematical attempts at solution by naive enthusiasts. These "solutions" often involve mistaken interpretations of the rules, or are simply incorrect.

== Background and problem statement ==
Bisection of arbitrary angles has long been solved.

Using only an unmarked straightedge and a compass, Greek mathematicians found means to divide a line into an arbitrary set of equal segments, to draw parallel lines, to bisect angles, to construct many polygons, and to construct squares of equal or twice the area of a given polygon.

Three problems proved elusive, specifically, trisecting the angle, doubling the cube, and squaring the circle. The problem of angle trisection reads:

Construct an angle equal to one-third of a given arbitrary angle (or divide it into three equal angles), using only two tools:

1. an unmarked straightedge, and
2. a compass.

== Proof of impossibility ==
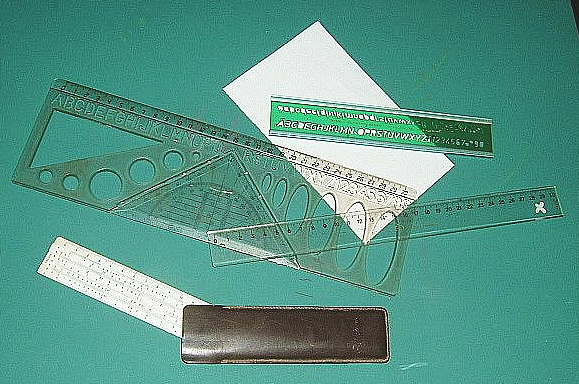
Rulers. The displayed ones are marked — an ideal straightedge is un-marked

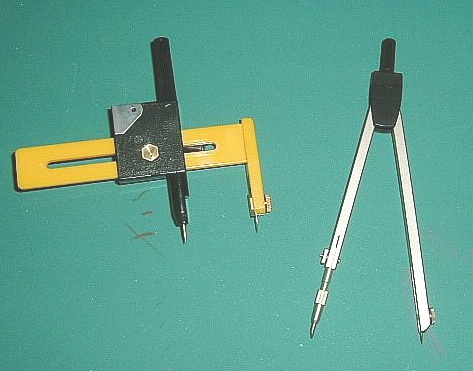
Compasses

Pierre Wantzel published a proof of the impossibility of classically trisecting an arbitrary angle in 1837. Wantzel's proof, restated in modern terminology, uses the concept of field extensions, a topic now typically combined with Galois theory. However, Wantzel published these results earlier than Évariste Galois (whose work, written in 1830, was not published until 1846) and did not use the concepts introduced by Galois.

The problem of constructing an angle of a given measure θ is equivalent to constructing two segments such that the ratio of their length is cos θ. From a solution to one of these two problems, one may pass to a solution of the other by a compass and straightedge construction. The triple-angle formula gives an expression relating the cosines of the original angle and its trisection: cos θ = 4 cos^{3} θ/3 − 3 cos θ/3.

It follows that, given a segment that is defined to have unit length, the problem of angle trisection is equivalent to constructing a segment whose length is the root of a cubic polynomial. This equivalence reduces the original geometric problem to a purely algebraic problem.

Every rational number is constructible. Every irrational number that is constructible in a single step from some given numbers is a root of a polynomial of degree 2 with coefficients in the field generated by these numbers. Therefore, any number that is constructible by a sequence of steps is a root of a minimal polynomial whose degree is a power of two. The angle π/3 radians (60 degrees, written 60°) is constructible. The argument below shows that it is impossible to construct a 20° angle. This implies that a 60° angle cannot be trisected, and thus that an arbitrary angle cannot be trisected.

Denote the set of rational numbers by Q. If 60° could be trisected, the degree of a minimal polynomial of cos 20° over Q would be a power of two. Now let x = cos 20°. Note that cos 60° = cos π/3 = 1/2. Then by the triple-angle formula, cos π/3 = 4x^{3} − 3x and so 4x^{3} − 3x = 1/2. Thus 8x^{3} − 6x − 1 = 0. Define p(t) to be the polynomial p(t) = 8t^{3} − 6t − 1.

Since x = cos 20° is a root of p(t), the minimal polynomial for cos 20° is a factor of p(t). Because p(t) has degree 3, if it is reducible over by Q then it has a rational root. By the rational root theorem, this root must be ±1, ±1/2, ±1/4 or ±1/8, but none of these is a root. Therefore, p(t) is irreducible over by Q, and the minimal polynomial for cos 20° is of degree 3.

So an angle of measure 60° cannot be trisected.

== Angles which can be trisected ==
However, some angles can be trisected. For example, for any constructible angle θ, an angle of measure 3θ can be trivially trisected by ignoring the given angle and directly constructing an angle of measure θ. There are angles that are not constructible but are trisectible (despite the one-third angle itself being non-constructible). For example, 3π/7 is such an angle: five angles of measure 3π/7 combine to make an angle of measure 15π/7, which is a full circle plus the desired π/7.

For a positive integer N, an angle of measure 2π/N is trisectible if and only if 3 does not divide N. In contrast, 2π/N is constructible if and only if N is a power of 2 or the product of a power of 2 with the product of one or more distinct Fermat primes.

=== Algebraic characterization ===
Again, denote the set of rational numbers by Q.

Theorem: An angle of measure θ may be trisected if and only if q(t) = 4t^{3} − 3t − cos(θ) is reducible over the field extension Q(cos(θ)).

The proof is a relatively straightforward generalization of the proof given above that a 60° angle is not trisectible.

=== Other numbers of parts ===
For any nonzero integer N, an angle of measure 2π/N radians can be divided into n equal parts with straightedge and compass if and only if n is either a power of 2 or is a power of 2 multiplied by the product of one or more distinct Fermat primes, none of which divides N. In the case of trisection (n = 3, which is a Fermat prime), this condition becomes the above-mentioned requirement that N not be divisible by 3.

== Other methods ==
The general problem of angle trisection is solvable by using additional tools, and thus going outside of the original Greek framework of compass and straightedge.

Many incorrect methods of trisecting the general angle have been proposed. Some of these methods provide reasonable approximations; others (some of which are mentioned below) involve tools not permitted in the classical problem. The mathematician Underwood Dudley has detailed some of these failed attempts in his book The Trisectors.

=== Approximation by successive bisections ===
Trisection can be approximated by repetition of the compass and straightedge method for bisecting an angle. The geometric series 1/3 = 1/4 + 1/16 + 1/64 + 1/256 + ⋯ or 1/3 = 1/2 − 1/4 + 1/8 − 1/16 + ⋯ can be used as a basis for the bisections. An approximation to any degree of accuracy can be obtained in a finite number of steps.

=== Using origami ===
Trisection, like many constructions impossible by ruler and compass, can easily be accomplished by the operations of paper folding, or origami. Huzita's axioms (types of folding operations) can construct cubic extensions (cube roots) of given lengths, whereas ruler-and-compass can construct only quadratic extensions (square roots).

=== Using a linkage ===
Sylvester's Link Fan

There are a number of simple linkages which can be used to make an instrument to trisect angles including Kempe's Trisector and Sylvester's Link Fan or Isoklinostat.

=== With a right triangular ruler ===
Bieberbach's trisection of an angle (in blue) by means of a right triangular ruler (in red)

In 1932, Ludwig Bieberbach published in Journal für die reine und angewandte Mathematik his work Zur Lehre von den kubischen Konstruktionen. He states therein (free translation):

"As is known ... every cubic construction can be traced back to the trisection of the angle and to the multiplication of the cube, that is, the extraction of the third root. I need only to show how these two classical tasks can be solved by means of the right angle hook."

The construction begins with drawing a circle passing through the vertex P of the angle to be trisected, centered at A on an edge of this angle, and having B as its second intersection with the edge. A circle centered at P and of the same radius intersects the line supporting the edge in A and O.

Now the right triangular ruler is placed on the drawing in the following manner: one leg of its right angle passes through O; the vertex of its right angle is placed at a point S on the line PC in such a way that the second leg of the ruler is tangent at E to the circle centered at A. It follows that the original angle is trisected by the line PE, and the line PD perpendicular to SE and passing through P. This line can be drawn either by using again the right triangular ruler, or by using a traditional straightedge and compass construction. With a similar construction, one can improve the location of E, by using that it is the intersection of the line SE and its perpendicular passing through A.

Proof: One has to prove the angle equalities $\widehat{EPD}= \widehat{DPS}$ and $\widehat{BPE} = \widehat{EPD}.$ The three lines OS, PD, and AE are parallel. As the line segments OP and PA are equal, these three parallel lines delimit two equal segments on every other secant line, and in particular on their common perpendicular SE. Thus SD' = D'E, where D' is the intersection of the lines PD and SE. It follows that the right triangles PD'S and PD'E are congruent, and thus that $\widehat{EPD}= \widehat{DPS},$ the first desired equality. On the other hand, the triangle PAE is isosceles, since all radiuses of a circle are equal; this implies that $\widehat{APE}=\widehat{AEP}.$ One has also $\widehat{AEP}=\widehat{EPD},$ since these two angles are alternate angles of a transversal to two parallel lines. This proves the second desired equality, and thus the correctness of the construction.

=== With an auxiliary curve ===
Trisection using the Archimedean spiral

Trisection using the Maclaurin trisectrix

There are certain curves called trisectrices which, if drawn on the plane using other methods, can be used to trisect arbitrary angles. Examples include the trisectrix of Colin Maclaurin, given in Cartesian coordinates by the implicit equation

$$2x(x^2+y^2)=a(3x^2-y^2),$$

and the Archimedean spiral. The spiral can, in fact, be used to divide an angle into any number of equal parts. Archimedes described how to trisect an angle using the Archimedean spiral in On Spirals around 225 BC.

=== With a marked ruler ===
Trisection of the angle using a marked ruler

Another means to trisect an arbitrary angle by a "small" step outside the Greek framework is via a ruler with two marks a set distance apart. The next construction is originally due to Archimedes, called a Neusis construction, i.e., that uses tools other than an un-marked straightedge. The diagrams we use show this construction for an acute angle, but it indeed works for any angle up to 180 degrees.

This requires three facts from geometry (at right):

1. Any full set of angles on a straight line add to 180°,
2. The sum of angles of any triangle is 180°, and,
3. Any two equal sides of an isosceles triangle will meet the third side at the same angle.

Let l be the horizontal line in the adjacent diagram. Angle a (left of point B) is the subject of trisection. First, a point A is drawn at an angle's ray, one unit apart from B. A circle of radius AB is drawn. Then, the markedness of the ruler comes into play: one mark of the ruler is placed at A and the other at B. While keeping the ruler (but not the mark) touching A, the ruler is slid and rotated until one mark is on the circle and the other is on the line l. The mark on the circle is labeled C and the mark on the line is labeled D. This ensures that CD = AB. A radius BC is drawn to make it obvious that line segments AB, BC, and CD all have equal length. Now, triangles ABC and BCD are isosceles, thus (by Fact 3 above) each has two equal angles.

Hypothesis: Given AD is a straight line, and AB, BC, and CD all have equal length,

Conclusion: angle b = a/3.

Proof:

1. From Fact 1) above, $e + c = 180$°.
2. Looking at triangle BCD, from Fact 2) $e + 2b = 180$°.
3. From the last two equations, $c = 2b$.
4. Therefore, $a=c+b=2b+b=3b$.

and the theorem is proved.

Again, this construction stepped outside the framework of allowed constructions by using a marked straightedge.

=== With a string ===
Thomas Hutcheson published an article in the Mathematics Teacher that used a string instead of a compass and straight edge. A string can be used as either a straight edge (by stretching it) or a compass (by fixing one point and identifying another), but can also wrap around a cylinder, the key to Hutcheson's solution.

Hutcheson constructed a cylinder from the angle to be trisected by drawing an arc across the angle, completing it as a circle, and constructing from that circle a cylinder on which a, say, equilateral triangle was inscribed (a 360-degree angle divided in three). This was then "mapped" onto the angle to be trisected, with a simple proof of similar triangles.

=== With a "tomahawk" ===
A tomahawk trisecting an angle. The tomahawk is formed by the thick lines and the shaded semicircle.

A "tomahawk" is a geometric shape consisting of a semicircle and two orthogonal line segments, such that the length of the shorter segment is equal to the circle radius. Trisection is executed by leaning the end of the tomahawk's shorter segment on one ray, the circle's edge on the other, so that the "handle" (longer segment) crosses the angle's vertex; the trisection line runs between the vertex and the center of the semicircle.

While a tomahawk is constructible with compass and straightedge, it is not generally possible to construct a tomahawk in any desired position. Thus, the above construction does not contradict the nontrisectibility of angles with ruler and compass alone.

As a tomahawk can be used as a set square, it can be also used for trisection angles by the method described in § With a right triangular ruler.

The tomahawk produces the same geometric effect as the paper-folding method: the distance between circle center and the tip of the shorter segment is twice the distance of the radius, which is guaranteed to contact the angle. It is also equivalent to the use of an architects L-Ruler (Carpenter's Square).

=== With interconnected compasses ===
An angle can be trisected with a device that is essentially a four-pronged version of a compass, with linkages between the prongs designed to keep the three angles between adjacent prongs equal.

== Uses of angle trisection ==
An animation of a neusis construction of a heptagon with radius of circumcircle $\overline{OA} = 6$, based on Andrew M. Gleason, using angle trisection by means of the tomahawk

A cubic equation with real coefficients can be solved geometrically with compass, straightedge, and an angle trisector if and only if it has three real roots.

A regular polygon with n sides can be constructed with ruler, compass, and angle trisector if and only if $n=2^r3^sp_1p_2\cdots p_k,$ where r, s, k ≥ 0 and where the p_{i} are distinct primes greater than 3 of the form $2^t3^u +1$ (i.e. Pierpont primes greater than 3).

== See also ==
- Bisection
- Constructible number
- Constructible polygon
- Morley's trisector theorem
- Trisectrix
