= Dinostratus =

Ancient Greek mathematician and geometer (c. 390–320 BC)

- Born: c. 390 BCE
- Died: c. 320 BCE
- Known for: Quadratrix of Dinostratus; Dinostratus' theorem
- Scientific career
- Fields: Mathematics

Dinostratus (Greek: Δεινόστρατος; c. 390 – c. 320 BCE) was a Greek mathematician and geometer, and the brother of Menaechmus. He is known for using the quadratrix to solve the problem of squaring the circle.

== Life and work ==
Dinostratus' chief contribution to mathematics was his solution to the problem of squaring the circle. To solve this problem, Dinostratus made use of the trisectrix of Hippias, for which he proved a special property (Dinostratus' theorem) that allowed him the squaring of the circle. Due to his work the trisectrix later became known as the quadratrix of Dinostratus as well. Although Dinostratus solved the problem of squaring the circle, he did not do so using ruler and compass alone, and so it was clear to the Greeks that his solution violated the foundational principles of their mathematics. Over 2,200 years later Ferdinand von Lindemann would prove that it is impossible to square a circle using straight edge and compass alone.

== Sources ==
- Boyer, Carl B. (1991). A History of Mathematics (Second ed.). John Wiley & Sons, Inc. ISBN 0-471-54397-7.
