= Hippias Major =

Dialogue of Plato

Hippias Major (or What is Beauty? or Greater Hippias (Greek: Ἱππίας μείζων, Hippías meízōn), to distinguish it from the Hippias Minor, which has the same chief character), is one of the dialogues of Plato, although its authenticity has been doubted. It belongs to the early dialogues, written while the author was still young. Its precise date is uncertain, although a date of c. 390 BC has been suggested.

In the Hippias Major, Socrates and Hippias set out to find a definition for "beauty", but are destined to fail due to their inability to formulate an answer which encompasses the entire concept. The actual Greek term that is used in the dialogue is καλόν, which as an adjective often means fine or noble as well as beautiful. For this reason, translators such as Paul Woodruff typically translate the term (τὸ καλόν—the abstract noun of the adjective) as "the Fine" (things) instead of "Beauty."

As in Charmides, Lysis and Euthyphro, Hippias Major has an "anatreptic" purpose, that is, the result of the dialogue is to defeat commonly held opinions, without necessarily offering a resolution. The concept of something good in and of itself (if only obliquely) makes its first appearance in this work. The dialogue can be read as much as a serious philosophical work as a light satirical comedy with two actors. The astuteness of Socrates in taking refuge under the authority of a supposed third protagonist in order to direct biting criticism at Hippias, endows the dialogue with humour.

== Dramatis personae ==
- Socrates
- Hippias, a well known sophist, originally from Elis. Known throughout Ancient Greece, he was reputed to have mastered mathematics, astronomy and rhetoric; he boasted that he could speak on any subject at Olympia without preparation. He is presented by Plato, perhaps somewhat caricatured, as vain, narrow, and of limited intellect; much as he is in Hippias Minor.

== Dialogue summary ==
=== Hippias meets Socrates ===
Hippias, whose business had kept him away from Athens for a long time, arrives in the city to give a lecture at Phidostratus' schoolroom in the next few days. He meets Socrates, and the latter asks him why such a precious and wise man as Hippias has deprived the Athenians of his presence for so long. It is, explains the great Sophist, because his native Elis was so in need of his services, and entrusted him with several important diplomatic missions to different cities; notably in Sparta. He made use of his travels throughout the Greek world to educate a large number of youth and earn large sums of money. One such example was the small town of Inycus, in Sicily, where the modest inhabitants sacrificed a good part of their savings to see their children die educated.

=== Could excessive application of the law lead to lawlessness? ===
Socrates ironically assures him that this is all admirable. And if Hippias has spent such a large part of his time in Sparta, he asks, this must be where he earned the most? But Hippias demurs: he did not touch an obolus there. It was not because the Spartans did not wish the best possible education for their children, and not because they did not comprehend the true value of Hippias. The only reason was that "it is not the inherited usage of the Lacedaemonians to change their laws or to educate their children differently from what is customary."

However, Socrates emphasized, the law is precisely made for use and happiness of the citizens, two things to which Hippias would have been greatly able to contribute. By being too attached to the law and refusing the services of Hippias, the Spartans contradict the aim of their own laws and thus therefore could be considered as being unlawful. Hippias agrees. Socrates then asks him then how he nevertheless had so much success in this severe city of Laconia. It is not, Hippias answers, for his knowledge of arithmetic or astronomy, but rather "They are very fond of hearing about the genealogies of heroes and men, Socrates, and the foundations of cities in ancient times and, in short, about antiquity in general...[these being] beautiful pursuits".

=== Socrates reveals his problem ===
Socrates is happy that Hippias came to reminisce on beautiful things, because this is a subject that interests Socrates greatly and with good reason. Recently, according to the latter, while criticising the beauty or ugliness of part of speeches, he claims to have been harassed by an acquaintance, who reproached him for not really knowing the definition of beauty. Thus embarrassed by this exposure, Socrates claims to be delighted that finally one as competent as Hippias will be able to provide his opinion on the nature of beauty. The great Sophist, flattered, does not object; and is goaded on by Socrates, who offers to reprise the discussion, playing the part of the harasser. This role-play on the part of Socrates adds to the comic nature of dialogue.

=== Hippias' three definitions ===
==== First definition: beauty is a pretty girl ====
Hippias first response is: "For be assured, Socrates, if I must speak the truth, a beautiful maiden is beautiful". Socrates estimates this to be, with his usual irony, a brilliant answer. But cannot they say that a lyre, a horse or even a pot is beautiful? The most beautiful of pots of course would not stand up to comparison with a beautiful girl, but then in turn what is the beauty of a girl in comparison to that of a goddess? In short, there is an infinite number of beautiful things besides beautiful girls. In any case, this is not really the question; it is not a question of knowing what is beautiful and what is not, but rather to define beauty and to say what makes beautiful things "beautiful".

==== Second definition: beauty is gold ====
The second response offered by Hippias is: "This that you ask about, the beautiful, is nothing else but gold... For we all know, I fancy, that wherever this is added, even what before appears ugly will appear beautiful when adorned with gold." No doubt, replies Socrates, but what to make then of the great statue of Athena at the Parthenon? This masterpiece of Phidias is mostly made of ivory and precious stones, and not of gold. Yet the statue is magnificent. Besides, gold or any other precious metal only gives rise to beauty if it is properly used. In the case of the pot, for instance, who is to say whether a wooden spoon or a golden spoon would be better to stir with, or which would be more beautiful?

==== Third definition: beauty is to be rich and respected ====
This time Hippias thinks that he understands: Socrates wants to know what no man will ever find ugly: "I say, then, that for every man and everywhere it is most beautiful to be rich and healthy, and honoured by the Greeks, to reach old age, and, after providing a beautiful funeral for his deceased parents, to be beautifully and splendidly buried by his own offspring." A scene follows, where Socrates shows his fear of the beating with a stick he would receive from his harasser if he had given that answer. What then of Achilles or Heracles? Was it beautiful for these two heroes, sons of the immortals, to be buried before their parents, before the gods? Was there no beauty in their lives because they were not buried by their offspring? Beauty in this sense then applies to ordinary men, but it would be ugliness for heroes. The definition is thus incorrect.

=== Socrates' four definitions ===
==== First definition: beauty is that which is appropriate ====
Tiring of the errors of Hippias, Socrates offers a definition in his turn, which he holds came from his famous harasser: the beautiful is simply that which is appropriate. This response pleases Hippias. But further examination is needed: first of all, is it the appropriateness which makes things beautiful, or does it simply make them appear to be beautiful? The second hypothesis is tempting: even a ridiculous man, dressed in nice clothing, will appear more beautiful. But inside he would still be ridiculous; thus appropriate and beautiful are not the same.

Hippias suggests that appropriateness provides at the same time the reality and the appearance of beauty. But then, nothing could be less sure; if everything was that simple, citizens and politicians would no longer have to quarrel to decide which action was the nicer.

==== Second definition: beauty is that which is useful ====
Socrates proposes a second solution: if it is beautiful, is it useful? But here again problems surface: it is through power that men make things useful. Nevertheless, as is well known, power can as much serve evil as it serves good. And there is difficulty in qualifying actions as bad or good. Which in turn requires that the definition be refocused; beauty is only usefulness applied to good ends, or those that are "favourable".

==== Third definition: beauty is that which is favourable ====
Identifying the beautiful and the favourable leads to a paradox: the favourable procreates the beautiful, as a father procreates a son. Since the favourable and the beautiful are thus considered to be one and the same, they arrive at the finding that beauty is the reason of goodness. In logic, a cause and an effect are two different things, as a father is different from the son. And thus they must conclude that Beauty is not good, and good is not beauty; an assertion which pleases neither Socrates nor Hippias.

==== Fourth definition: beauty is the pleasure that comes from seeing and hearing ====
To conclude, Socrates brings out a final definition; at first glance quite amazing: "[what] if we were to say that that is beautiful which makes us feel joy; I do not mean all pleasures, but that which makes us feel joy through hearing and sight?" This hypothesis, while appealing, contains according to Socrates himself a fundamental flaw; that it ignores the beauty of the more noble pleasures, drawn from the studious occupations or the study of laws.

On the other hand, it seems striking that only the senses of sight and hearing are taken into account. Is this a way to submit to common opinion, which is that touch, taste and smell are somehow more shameful and base than the other senses? Finally, it is not simply because pleasure comes from seeing or hearing that it is beautiful. Socrates throws himself into a series of considerations: taking into account pairs of objects, in the Majority of cases the term which they apply to both objects (A and B are beautiful, A and B are just) can apply also to an object taken separately (A is beautiful and B is beautiful). But in some rare cases it can happen that it this is not the case, notably when the sum of A and B forms an even number and A and B, taken in isolation, are two odd numbers.

In the case of beauty, it is the first category that is appropriate, because if a pair of two objects is beautiful, it stands to reason that each of them is. But a new paradox appears, since the beautiful, in discreet definition, must belong to both pleasures of sight and hearing, taken jointly, and cannot belong to only one of them. The definition as a result proves to be flawed. Exhausted by the many questions they have considered, Hippias berates Socrates and urges him instead of "with mere talk and nonsense" to seek beauty in "the ability to produce a discourse well and beautifully in a court of law or a council-house or before any other public body before which the discourse may be delivered." Socrates, taking his leave, pretends to feel bad about the situation, cornered between the attacks of Hippias and those of his mysterious opponent. His only certainty, he concludes with a sense of humour, is that from now on he better understands the Greek proverb "beautiful things are difficult".

== Authenticity ==
The authorship of Hippias Major has been disputed. Although some works previously attributed to Plato have been determined to be inauthentic, this is one where authorship has still not been firmly established, though academic consensus tends toward its authenticity. The argument is summarized in (Sider 1977): "Dorothy Tarrant is the foremost advocate for the cause of spuriousness: cf. her edition of The Hippias Major Attributed to Plato (Cambridge, 1928). Opposing her in a series of articles is G. M. A. Grube, who wrote in 1926 and 1927. W. K. C. Guthrie, in A History of Greek Philosophy (Cambridge 1975) also argues for its genuineness." Sider, writing in 1992 states that G. R. Ledger, in Re-counting Plato (Oxford 1989) carried out a computer text analysis and though not conclusive "On balance the evidence for genuineness is fairly convincing". He goes on to state that amongst other recent works, P. Woodruff, Plato: Hippias Major (Oxford 1982) also argues for authenticity and dates the document to "around 390" BC.

C. H. Kahn, "The Beautiful and the Genuine," OSAP 3 (1985:261–87) is the lone modern figure maintaining spuriousness. The Internet Encyclopedia of Philosophy states "Of those [of Plato's works] we listed as authentic, above (in the early group), only the Hippias Major continues occasionally to be listed as inauthentic. The strongest evidence against the authenticity of the Hippias Major is the fact that it is never mentioned in any of the ancient sources. In summary then, although early 20th century scholarship argued that it was spurious, latest research indicates that on the balance it is more likely authentic than not.

== Texts and translations ==
- Plato: Cratylus, Parmenides, Greater Hippias, Lesser Hippias. Greek with translation by Harold N. Fowler. Loeb Classical Library 167. Harvard Univ. Press (originally published 1926). ISBN 9780674991859 HUP listing
- Plato. Hippias Major, from Plato Vol. 9 translated by W. R. M. Lamb. Cambridge, MA, Harvard University Press; London, William Heinemann Ltd. 1925. From Perseus
- Plato. Complete Works. translated by John M. Cooper and D. S. Hutchinson, Hackett, 1997. ISBN 978-0872203495
- Platon. Größerer Hippias. Übersetzung und Kommentar by Ernst Heitsch. Platon: Werke, vol. VII,1. Vandenhoeck & Ruprecht, 2011 [German translation and commentary]
