= Sporus of Nicaea =

Greek mathematician and astronomer (c. 240–300)

- Born: c. 240; Nicaea
- Died: c. 300

Sporus of Nicaea (Greek: Σπόρος; c. 240 – c. 300) was an ancient Greek geometer and astronomer from Nicaea.

== Biography ==
Little is known of his life besides his birthplace. He had a mathematical instructor, Philo of Gadara, of whom nothing is known about other than he gave an approximation for π better than Archimedes.

In geometry, Sporus seemed to dwell on the classical problems of antiquity like Squaring the circle and Doubling the cube, where he mostly copied and criticized his predecessors' techniques. In astronomy he commented on the ancient star catalogues, but it seems he may have tried to give his own explanation for rare celestial phenomena. Leontius Mechanicus calls Sporus a commentator.

== Geometry ==
=== Criticism of the Quadratrix of Hippias ===
Sporus denounces the Quadratrix of Hippias as a tool for geometry, following in the footsteps of Plato who denounced all mechanical contraptions for geometric purposes. The quadratrix trivializes angle trisection and does not reveal anything shocking or wonderful. Furthermore, the end of the curve is indeterminate, for the intersection of two coincident lines is everywhere. However, the end of the curve does asymptote to a point. Dinostratus assumes this point can be found, and used it in his theorem to square the circle, and therefore what was set out to be found (π) was actually given in the assumptions. Thus Sporus criticized the use of the quadratrix, and Pappus of Alexandria shared in his malcontent.

=== Duplication of the Cube ===
Relying on the reduction of Hippocrates, Sporus was among the many mathematicians who found two mean proportionals between in continuous proportion. The Archimedean commentator Eutocius preserved the construction in its entirety. His theorem is apparently identical to the one given by Diocles.

== Astronomy ==
- Sporus taught the descriptions of stars in the Phenomena of Aratus were not made with precision, but rather with a view to their usefulness for sailors.
- Sporus comments on how far the human eye can see into the heavens, as well as how much of the sky can be seen at once. He thinks the human eye can comprehend the width of two zodiac signs in the sky.
- Sporus taught comets were formed by the emanation of heat particles from the underlying substances, which the stars release upward to the sky; for fire naturally moves upward. He said the rays of stars were their "hair".
- Sporus described an optical phenomenon that occurs near sunrise and sunset that sounds a lot like a Sun dog. He says when the Sun is low and clouds gather near it in the horizon, they can reflect and refract the Sun’s light in such a way that they appear like a second Sun. The cloud, saturated with the Sun’s rays, glows with a fiery brightness, creating the illusion of a twin Sun.

== Writings ==
All of Sporus's writings are lost or fragmentary. The titles and contents of a few of his works are known.

=== Aristotelian Wax Tablets ===
This work is sometimes simply referred to as the Waxing (Greek: Κηρίοις). Sporus seems to disparage ancient attempts to square the circle.

Sporus criticized the false conclusions on the squarings of Hippocrates of Chios and Antiphon, in the same way that Eudemus did in his History of Geometry. Alexander of Aphrodisias, who lived before Sporus, also attacked the methods of Hippocrates and Antiphon. Hippocrates brilliantly found several quadratures of lunes but in the end made an elementary mistake, while Antiphon's proof required infinite steps, thus being incomplete.

Sporus also criticized the great mathematician Archimedes for his seemingly poor approximation of π, that it was in between 3 1/7 and 3 10/71. He went on to explain his mentor, Philo of Gadara, easily achieved a much closer approximation to π. Even Apollonius of Perga, a contemporary of Archimedes, in his Rapid Delivery found much more accurate ratios. Eutocius defends Archimedes, explaining a numerically simple ratio yet acceptable approximation was suitable for practical needs in life.

In this work Sporus may have also placed his criticism of the use of the quadratrix in Dinostratus's theorem.

=== On Hipparchus ===
What is preserved in an apparent commentary on Hipparchus's Star Catalogue, Sporus outlines its introduction. He discusses Hipparchus's division of the sphere into north stars and south stars. He explains that Hipparchus began cataloguing stars in the northernmost regions in honor of Zeus. He retells mythological stories of the constellations. Finally he defines astronomical terms like "pole" and "axis" giving them a brief etymology and placing them in the context of mythological origins.

=== Isagogue ===
There is an Isagogue or introduction to the Phenomena attributed to Aratus that is actually by Sporus. In this work Sporus could have put his astronomical criticisms for Aratus.

=== Other works ===
- A tract containing his solution to the duplication of the cube.
