= Limaçon trisectrix =

Quartic plane curve

The limaçon trisectrix specified as the polar equation $r=a(1+2\cos\theta),$ where a > 0. When a < 0, the resulting curve is the reflection of this curve with respect to the line $\theta=\pi/2.$ As a function, r has a period of 2π. The inner and outer loops of the curve intersect at the pole.

In geometry, a limaçon trisectrix is the name for the quartic plane curve that is a trisectrix that is specified as a limaçon. The shape of the limaçon trisectrix can be specified by other curves particularly as a rose, conchoid or epitrochoid. The curve is one among a number of plane curve trisectrixes that includes the Conchoid of Nicomedes, the Cycloid of Ceva, Quadratrix of Hippias, Trisectrix of Maclaurin, and Tschirnhausen cubic. The limaçon trisectrix a special case of a sectrix of Maclaurin.

== Specification and loop structure ==
The limaçon trisectrix specified as a polar equation is

$r= a(1+2\cos\theta)$.

The constant $a$ may be positive or negative. The two curves with constants $a$ and $-a$ are reflections of each other across the line $\theta=\pi/2$. The period of $r= a(1+2\cos\theta)$ is $2\pi$ given the period of the sinusoid $\cos\theta$.

The limaçon trisectrix is composed of two loops.

- The outer loop is defined when $1+2\cos\theta\ge0$ on the polar angle interval $-2\pi/3 \le \theta \le 2\pi/3$, and is symmetric about the polar axis. The point furthest from the pole on the outer loop has the coordinates $(3a,0)$.
- The inner loop is defined when $1+2\cos\theta\le0$ on the polar angle interval $2\pi/3 \le \theta \le 4\pi/3$, and is symmetric about the polar axis. The point furthest from the pole on the inner loop has the coordinates $(a,0)$, and on the polar axis, is one-third of the distance from the pole compared to the furthest point of the outer loop.
- The outer and inner loops intersect at the pole.

The curve can be specified in Cartesian coordinates as

$$a^2(x^2+y^2)= (x^2+y^2-2ax)^2$$,

and parametric equations

$$x=(a+2a\cos\theta)\cos\theta=a(1+\cos\theta+\cos(2\theta))$$,
$$y=(a+2a\cos\theta)\sin\theta=a(\sin\theta+\sin(2\theta))$$.

=== Relationship with rose curves ===
In polar coordinates, the shape of $r= a(1+2\cos\theta)$ is the same as that of the rose $r = 2a\cos(\theta /3)$. Corresponding points of the rose are a distance $|a|$ to the left of the limaçon's points when $a>0$, and $|a|$ to the right when $a<0$. As a rose, the curve has the structure of a single petal with two loops that is inscribed in the circle $r=2a$ and is symmetric about the polar axis.

The inverse of this rose is a trisectrix since the inverse has the same shape as the trisectrix of Maclaurin.

=== Relationship with the sectrix of Maclaurin ===
See the article Sectrix of Maclaurin on the limaçon as an instance of the sectrix.

== Trisection properties ==
The outer and inner loops of the limaçon trisectrix have angle trisection properties. Theoretically, an angle may be trisected using a method with either property, though practical considerations may limit use.

=== Outer loop trisectrix property ===
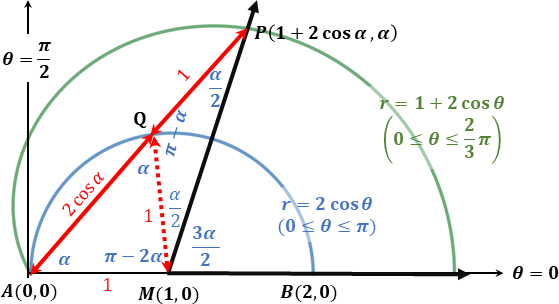
Angle trisection property of the (green) outer loop of the limaçon trisectrix $r=1+2\cos\theta$. The (blue) generating circle $r=2\cos\theta$ is required to prove the trisection of $\angle{PMB}$. The (red) construction results in two angles, $\angle{QMP}$ and $\angle{QPM}$, that have one-third the measure of $\angle{PMB}$; and one angle, $\angle{PAB}$, that has two-thirds the measure of $\angle{PMB}$.

The construction of the outer loop of $r=1+2\cos\theta$ reveals its angle trisection properties. The outer loop exists on the interval $-2\pi/3 \le \theta \le 2\pi/3$. Here, we examine the trisectrix property of the portion of the outer loop above the polar axis, i.e., defined on the interval $0 \le \theta \le 2\pi/3$.

- First, note that polar equation $r=2\cos\theta$ is a circle with radius $1$, center $M(1,0)$ on the polar axis, and has a diameter that is tangent to the line $\theta=\pi/2$ at the pole $A$. Denote the diameter containing the pole as $\overline{AB}$, where $B$ is at $(2,0)$.
- Second, consider any chord $\overline{AQ}$ of the circle with the polar angle $\theta=\alpha$. Since $\triangle{AQB}$ is a right triangle, $AQ=2\cos\alpha$. The corresponding point $P$ on the outer loop has coordinates $(AQ+1,\alpha)$, where $0 < \alpha \le \pi$.

Given this construction, it is shown that $\angle{QMP}$ and two other angles trisect $\angle{PMB}$ as follows:

- $m\angle{QMB}=2\alpha$, as it is the central angle for $\widehat{QB}$ on the circle $r=2\cos\theta$.
- The base angles of isosceles triangle $\triangle{AMQ}$ measure $\alpha$ – specifically, $m\angle{QAB}=m\angle{AQM}=\alpha$.
- The apex angle of isosceles triangle $\triangle{PQM}$ is supplementary with $\angle{AQM}$, and so, $m\angle{PQM}=\pi-\alpha$. Consequently the base angles, $\angle{QMP}$ and $\angle{QPM}$ measure $\alpha/2$.
- $m\angle{PMB}=m\angle{QMB}-m\angle{QMP}=2\alpha-\alpha/2=3\alpha/2$. Thus $\angle{PMB}$ is trisected, since $m\angle{QMP}/m\angle{PMB}=1/3$.
- Note that also $m\angle{QPM}/m\angle{QMB}=1/3$, and $m\angle{PAB}/m\angle{QMB}=2/3$.

The upper half of the outer loop can trisect any central angle of $r=2\cos\theta$ because $0<3\alpha/2<\pi$ implies $0<\alpha<2\pi/3$ which is in the domain of the outer loop.

=== Inner loop trisectrix property ===
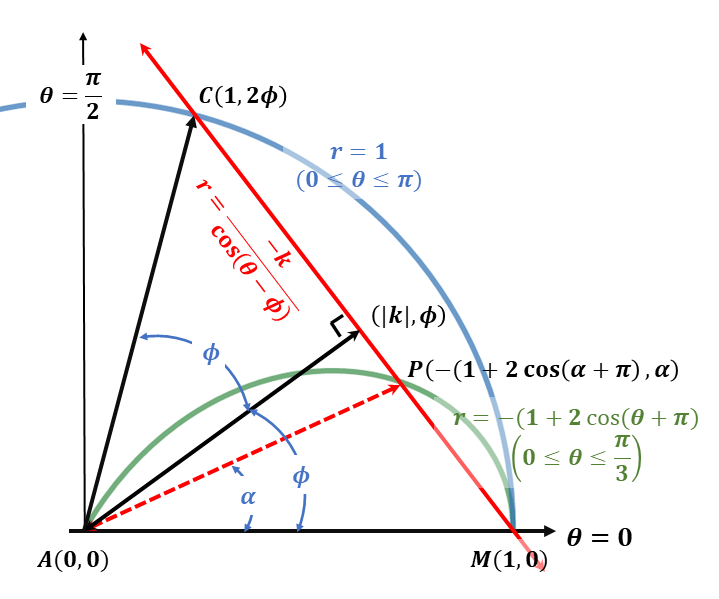
Angle trisection property of the (green) inner loop of the limaçon trisectrix $r=1+2\cos\theta$. Given a point $C$ on the (blue) unit circle $r=1$ centered at the pole $A$ with $M$ at $(1,0)$, where $\overline{CM}$ (in red) intersects the inner loop at $P$, $\angle{PAM}$ trisects $\angle{CAM}$. The (black) normal line to $\overleftrightarrow{CM}$ is $\theta=\phi$, so $C$ is at $(1,2\phi)$. The inner loop is redefined on the interval $0\le\theta\le\pi/3$ as $r=-(1+2\cos(\theta+\pi))$ because its native range is greater than $\pi$ where its radial coordinates are non-positive.

The inner loop of the limaçon trisectrix has the desirable property that the trisection of an angle is internal to the angle being trisected. Here, we examine the inner loop of $r=1+2\cos\theta$ that lies above the polar axis, which is defined on the polar angle interval $\pi \le \theta \le 4\pi/3$. The trisection property is that given a central angle that includes a point $C$ lying on the unit circle with center at the pole, $r=1$, has a measure three times the measure of the polar angle of the point $P$ at the intersection of chord $\overline{CM}$ and the inner loop, where $M$ is at $(1,0)$.

In Cartesian coordinates the equation of $\overleftrightarrow{CM}$ is $y=k(x-1)$, where $k<0$, which is the polar equation

$r=\frac{-k}{\sin\theta - k\cos\theta}=\frac{-k}{\cos(\theta-\phi)}=-k\sec(\theta-\phi)$, where $\tan\phi=\frac{1}{-k}$ and $\phi=atan2(1,-k)$.

(Note: atan2(y,x) gives the polar angle of the Cartesian coordinate point (x,y).)

Since the normal line to $\overleftrightarrow{CM}$ is $\theta=\phi$, it bisects the apex of isosceles triangle $\triangle{CAM}$, so $m\angle{CAM}=2\phi$ and the polar coordinates of $C$ is $(1,2\phi)$.

With respect to the limaçon, the range of polar angles $\pi \le \theta \le 4\pi/3$ that defines the inner loop is problematic because the range of polar angles subject to trisection falls in the range $0\le\theta\le\pi$. Furthermore, on its native domain, the radial coordinates of the inner loop are non-positive. The inner loop then is equivalently redefined within the polar angle range of interest and with non-negative radial coordinates as $r=-(1+2\cos(\theta+\pi))=-(1-2\cos\theta)$, where $-\cos(\theta+\pi)=\cos\theta$. Thus, the polar coordinate $\alpha$ of $P$ is determined by

$$-(1-2\cos\alpha)=\frac{-k}{\sin\alpha - k\cos\alpha}$$
$$\rightarrow (\sin\alpha - k\cos\alpha)-2\cos\alpha\sin\alpha+2k\cos^2\alpha = k$$
$$\rightarrow \cos(\alpha-\phi)-\sin(2\alpha)+2k (\frac{1+\cos(2\alpha)}{2})=k$$
$$\rightarrow \cos(\alpha-\phi)-\sin(2\alpha)+k\cos(2\alpha)=0$$
$$\rightarrow \cos(\alpha-\phi)=\cos(2\alpha-\phi)$$.

The last equation has two solutions, the first being: $\alpha-\phi=2\alpha-\phi$, which results in $\alpha=0$, the polar axis, a line that intersects both curves but not at $C$ on the unit circle.

The second solution is based on the identity $\cos(x) = \cos(-x)$ which is expressed as

$\alpha-\phi=\phi-2\alpha$, which implies $2\phi=3\alpha$,

and shows that $m\angle{CAM}=3(m\angle{PAM})$ demonstrating the larger angle has been trisected.

The upper half of the inner loop can trisect any central angle of $r=1$ because $0<3\alpha<\pi$ implies $0<\alpha<\pi/3$ which is in the domain of the redefined loop.

=== Line segment trisection property ===
The limaçon trisectrix $r=a(1+2\cos\theta)$ trisects the line segment on the polar axis that serves as its axis of symmetry. Since the outer loop extends to the point $(3a,0)$ and the inner loop to the point $(a,0)$, the limaçon trisects the segment with endpoints at the pole (where the two loops intersect) and the point $(3a,0)$, where the total length of $3a$ is three times the length running from the pole to the other end of the inner loop along the segment.

== Relationship with the trisectrix hyperbola ==
Given the limaçon trisectrix $r=1+2\cos\theta$, the inverse $r^{-1}$ is the polar equation of a hyperbola with eccentricity equal to 2, a curve that is a trisectrix. (See Hyperbola - angle trisection.)
