= Rose (mathematics) =

Multi-lobed plane curve

Roses specified by the sinusoid r = cos(kθ) for various rational numbered values of the angular frequency k = n/d. For proper mathematical analysis, k must be expressed in irreducible form.

In mathematics, a rose or rhodonea curve is a sinusoid specified by either the cosine or sine functions with no phase angle that is plotted in polar coordinates. Rose curves or "rhodonea" were named by the Italian mathematician who studied them, Guido Grandi, between the years 1723 and 1728.

== General overview ==
=== Specification ===
A rose is the set of points in polar coordinates specified by the polar equation

$$r=a\cos(k\theta)$$

or in Cartesian coordinates using the parametric equations

$$\begin{align}
x &= r\cos(\theta) = a\cos(k\theta)\cos(\theta) \\
y &= r\sin(\theta) = a\cos(k\theta)\sin(\theta)
\end{align}$$

Roses can also be specified using the sine function. Since

$$\sin(k \theta) = \cos\left( k \theta - \frac{\pi}{2} \right) = \cos\left( k \left( \theta-\frac{\pi}{2k} \right) \right)$$.

Thus, the rose specified by r = a sin(kθ) is identical to that specified by r = a cos(kθ) rotated counter-clockwise by π/2k radians, which is one-quarter the period of either sinusoid.

Since they are specified using the cosine or sine function, roses are usually expressed as polar coordinate (rather than Cartesian coordinate) graphs of sinusoids that have angular frequency of k and an amplitude of a that determine the radial coordinate r given the polar angle θ (though when k is a rational number, a rose curve can be expressed in Cartesian coordinates since those can be specified as algebraic curves).

=== General properties ===
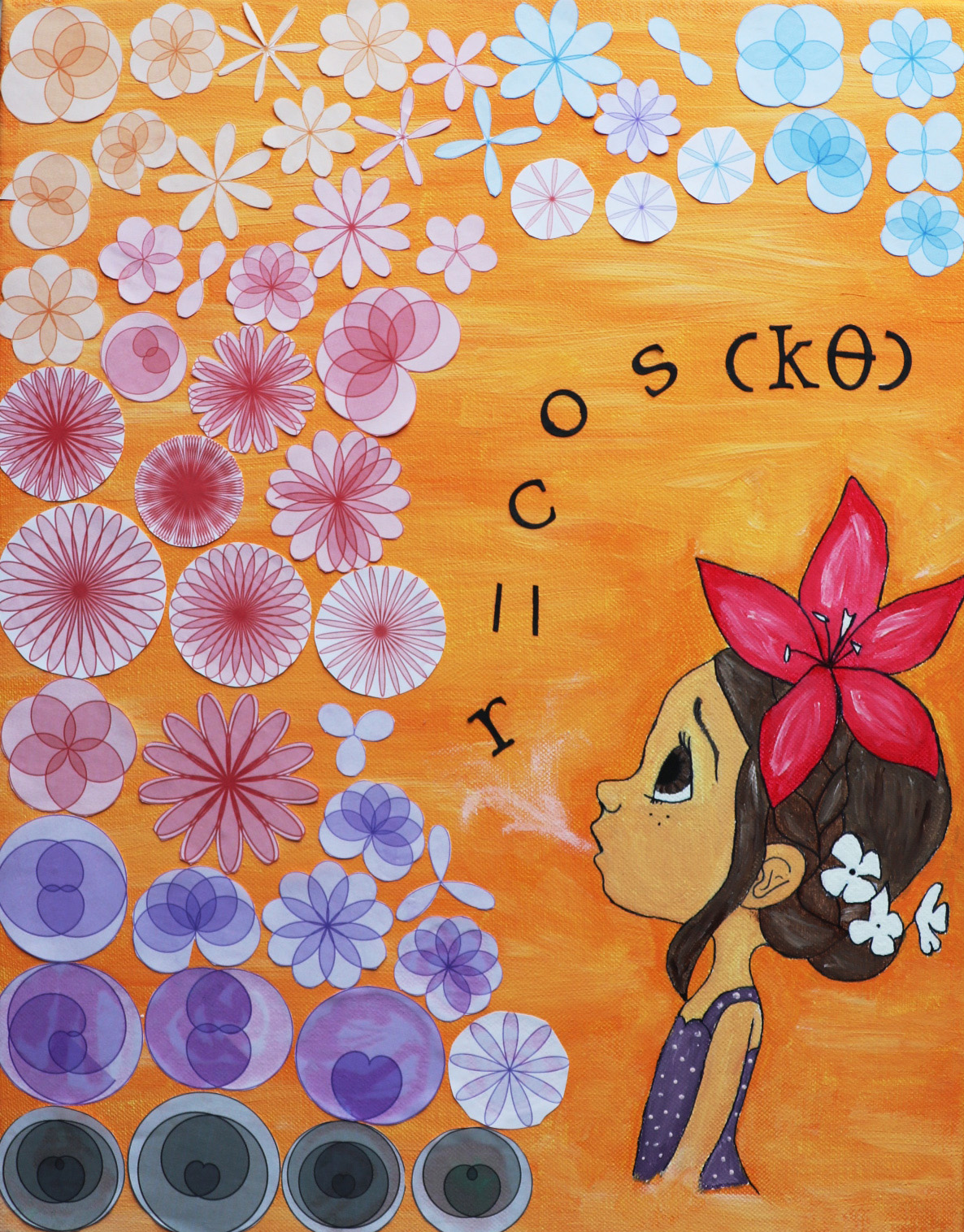
Artistic depiction of roses with different parameter settings

Roses are directly related to the properties of the sinusoids that specify them.

==== Petals ====
- Graphs of roses are composed of petals. A petal is the shape formed by the graph of a half-cycle of the sinusoid that specifies the rose. (A cycle is a portion of a sinusoid that is one period T = 2π/k long and consists of a positive half-cycle, the continuous set of points where r ≥ 0 and is T/2 = π/k long, and a negative half-cycle is the other half where r ≤ 0.)
  - The shape of each petal is same because the graphs of half-cycles have the same shape. The shape is given by the positive half-cycle with crest at (a,0) specified by r = a cos(kθ) (that is bounded by the angle interval −T/4 ≤ θ ≤ T/4). The petal is symmetric about the polar axis. All other petals are rotations of this petal about the pole, including those for roses specified by the sine function with same values for a and k.
  - Consistent with the rules for plotting points in polar coordinates, a point in a negative half-cycle cannot be plotted at its polar angle because its radial coordinate r is negative. The point is plotted by adding π radians to the polar angle with a radial coordinate |r|. Thus, positive and negative half-cycles can be coincident in the graph of a rose. In addition, roses are inscribed in the circle r = a.
  - When the period T of the sinusoid is less than or equal to 4π, the petal's shape is a single closed loop. A single loop is formed because the angle interval for a polar plot is 2π and the angular width of the half-cycle is less than or equal to 2π. When T > 4π (or |k| < 1/2) the plot of a half-cycle can be seen as spiraling out from the pole in more than one circuit around the pole until plotting reaches the inscribed circle where it spirals back to the pole, intersecting itself and forming one or more loops along the way. Consequently, each petal forms two loops when 4π < T ≤ 8π (or 1/4 ≤ |k| < 1/2), three loops when 8π < T ≤ 12π (or 1/6 ≤ |k| < 1/4), etc. Roses with only one petal with multiple loops are observed for k = 1/3, 1/5, 1/7, etc. (See the figure in the introduction section.)
  - A rose's petals will not intersect each other when the angular frequency k is a non-zero integer; otherwise, petals intersect one another.

==== Symmetry ====
All roses display one or more forms of symmetry due to the underlying symmetric and periodic properties of sinusoids.

- A rose specified as r = a cos(kθ) is symmetric about the polar axis (the line θ = 0) because of the identity a cos(kθ) = a cos(−kθ) that makes the roses specified by the two polar equations coincident.
- A rose specified as r = a sin(kθ) is symmetric about the vertical line θ = π/2 because of the identity a sin(kθ) = a sin(π − kθ) that makes the roses specified by the two polar equations coincident.
- Only certain roses are symmetric about the pole.
- Individual petals are symmetric about the line through the pole and the petal's peak, which reflects the symmetry of the half-cycle of the underlying sinusoid. Roses composed of a finite number of petals are, by definition, rotationally symmetric since each petal is the same shape with successive petals rotated about the same angle about the pole.

== Roses with non-zero integer values of k ==
The rose r = cos(4θ). Since k = 4 is an even number, the rose has 2k = 8 petals. Line segments connecting successive peaks lie on the circle r = 1 and will form an octagon. Since one peak is at (1,0) the octagon makes sketching the graph relatively easy after the half-cycle boundaries (corresponding to apothems) are drawn.

The rose specified by r = cos(7θ). Since k = 7 is an odd number, the rose has k = 7 petals. Line segments connecting successive peaks lie on the circle r = 1 and will form a heptagon. The rose is inscribed in the circle r = 1.

When k is a non-zero integer, the curve will be rose-shaped with 2k petals if k is even, and k petals when k is odd. The properties of these roses are a special case of roses with angular frequencies k that are rational numbers discussed in the next section of this article.

- The rose is inscribed in the circle r = a, corresponding to the radial coordinate of all of its peaks.
- Because a polar coordinate plot is limited to polar angles between 0 and 2π, there are 2π/T = k cycles displayed in the graph. No additional points need be plotted because the radial coordinate at θ = 0 is the same value at θ = 2π (which are crests for two different positive half-cycles for roses specified by the cosine function).
- When k is even (and non-zero), the rose is composed of 2k petals, one for each peak in the 2π interval of polar angles displayed. Each peak corresponds to a point lying on the circle r = a. Line segments connecting successive peaks will form a regular polygon with an even number of vertices that has its center at the pole and a radius through each peak, and likewise:
  - The roses are symmetric about the pole.
  - The roses are symmetric about each line through the pole and a peak (through the "middle" a petal) with the polar angle between the peaks of successive petals being 2π/2k = π/k radians. Thus, these roses have rotational symmetry of order 2k.
  - The roses are symmetric about each line that bisects the angle between successive peaks, which corresponds to half-cycle boundaries and the apothem of the corresponding polygon.
- When k is odd, the rose is composed of the k petals, one for each crest (or trough) in the 2π interval of polar angles displayed. Each peak corresponds to a point lying on the circle r = a. These rose's positive and negative half-cycles are coincident, which means that in graphing them, only the positive half-cycles or only the negative half-cycles need to plotted in order to form the full curve. (Equivalently, a complete curve will be graphed by plotting any continuous interval of polar angles that is π radians long such as θ = 0 to θ = π.) Line segments connecting successive peaks will form a regular polygon with an odd number of vertices, and likewise:
  - The roses are symmetric about each line through the pole and a peak (through the middle of a petal) with the polar angle between the peaks of successive petals being 2π/k radians. Thus, these roses have rotational symmetry of order k.
- The rose’s petals do not overlap.
- The roses can be specified by algebraic curves of order k + 1 when k is odd, and 2(k + 1) when k is even.

=== The circle ===
A rose with k = 1 is a circle that lies on the pole with a diameter that lies on the polar axis when r = a cos(θ). The circle is the curve's single petal. (See the circle being formed at the end of the next section.) In Cartesian coordinates, the equivalent cosine and sine specifications are

$$\left(x-\frac{a}{2}\right)^2+y^2=\left(\frac{a}{2}\right)^2$$

and

$$x^2+\left(y-\frac{a}{2}\right)^2=\left(\frac{a}{2}\right)^2$$

respectively.

=== The quadrifolium ===
A rose with k = 2 is called a quadrifolium because it has 2k = 4 petals and will form a square. In Cartesian coordinates the cosine and sine specifications are

$$\left(x^2+y^2\right)^3=a^2\left(x^2-y^2\right)^2$$

and

$$\left(x^2+y^2\right)^3=\left(2axy\right)^2$$

respectively.

=== The trifolium ===
A rose with k = 3 is called a trifolium because it has k = 3 petals and will form an equilateral triangle. The curve is also called the Paquerette de Mélibée. In Cartesian Coordinates the cosine and sine specifications are

$$\left(x^2+y^2\right)^2=a\left(x^3-3xy^2\right)$$

and

$$\left(x^2+y^2\right)^2=a\left(3x^2y-y^3\right)$$

respectively. (See the trifolium being formed at the end of the next section.)

=== The octafolium ===
A rose with k = 4 is called an octafolium because it has 2k = 8 petals and will form an octagon. In Cartesian Coordinates the cosine and sine specifications are

$$\left(x^2+y^2\right)^5=a^2\left(x^4-6x^2y^2+y^4\right)^2$$

and

$$\left(x^2+y^2\right)^5=16a^2\left(xy^3-yx^3\right)^2$$

respectively.

=== The pentafolium ===
A rose with k = 5 is called a pentafolium because it has k = 5 petals and will form a regular pentagon. In Cartesian Coordinates the cosine and sine specifications are

$$\left(x^2+y^2\right)^3=a\left(x^5-10x^3y^2+5xy^4\right)$$

and

$$\left(x^2+y^2\right)^3=a\left(5x^4y-10x^2y^3+y^5\right)$$

respectively.

=== The dodecafolium ===
A rose with k = 6 is called a dodecafolium because it has 2k = 12 petals and will form a dodecagon. In Cartesian Coordinates the cosine and sine specifications are

$$\left(x^2+y^2\right)^7=a^2\left(x^6-15x^4y^2+15x^2y^4-y^6\right)^2$$

and

$$\left(x^2+y^2\right)^7=4a^2\left(3x^5y-10x^3y^3+3xy^5\right)^2$$

respectively.

=== Total and petal areas ===
The total area of a rose with polar equation of the form r = a cos(kθ) or r = a sin(kθ), where k is a non-zero integer, is

$$\begin{align}
\frac{1}{2}\int_{0}^{2\pi}(a\cos (k\theta))^2\,d\theta &= \frac {a^2}{2} \left(\pi + \frac{\sin(4k\pi)}{4k}\right) = \frac{\pi a^2}{2} &&\quad\text{for even }k\\[8px]
\frac{1}{2}\int_{0}^{\pi}(a\cos (k\theta))^2\,d\theta &= \frac {a^2}{2} \left(\frac{\pi}{2} + \frac{\sin(2k\pi)}{4k}\right) = \frac{\pi a^2}{4} &&\quad\text{for odd }k
\end{align}$$

When k is even, there are 2k petals; and when k is odd, there are k petals, so the area of each petal is πa^{2}/4k.

As a consequence, if someone wanted to play the popular game He loves me... he loves me not on a rose like above, instead of counting the petals they could calculate the area of the rose to determine the result of the game.

== Roses with rational number values for k ==
In general, when k is a rational number in the irreducible fraction form k = n/d, where n and d are non-zero integers, the number of petals is the denominator of the expression 1/2 − 1/2k = (n − d)/2n. This means that the number of petals is n if both n and d are odd, and 2n otherwise.

- In the case when both n and d are odd, the positive and negative half-cycles of the sinusoid are coincident. The graph of these roses are completed in any continuous interval of polar angles that is dπ long.
- When n is even and d is odd, or visa versa, the rose will be completely graphed in a continuous polar angle interval 2dπ long. Furthermore, the roses are symmetric about the pole for both cosine and sine specifications.
  - In addition, when n is odd and d is even, roses specified by the cosine and sine polar equations with the same values of a and k are coincident. For such a pair of roses, the rose with the sine function specification is coincident with the crest of the rose with the cosine specification at on the polar axis either at θ = dπ/2 or at θ = 3dπ/2. (This means that roses r = a cos(kθ) and r = a sin(kθ) with non-zero integer values of k are never coincident.)
- The rose is inscribed in the circle r = a, corresponding to the radial coordinate of all of its peaks.

=== The Dürer folium ===
A rose with k = 1/2 is called the Dürer folium, named after the German painter and engraver Albrecht Dürer. The roses specified by r = a cos(θ/2) and r = a sin(θ/2) are coincident even though a cos(θ/2) ≠ a sin(θ/2). In Cartesian coordinates the rose is specified as

$$\left(x^2+y^2\right)\left(2\left(x^2+y^2\right)-a^2\right)^2=a^4x^2$$

The Dürer folium is also a trisectrix, a curve that can be used to trisect angles.

=== The limaçon trisectrix ===
A rose with k = 1/3 is a limaçon trisectrix that has the property of trisectrix curves that can be used to trisect angles. The rose has a single petal with two loops. (See the animation below.)

Examples of roses r = cos(kθ) created using gears with different ratios.
The rays displayed are the polar axis and θ = π/2.
Graphing starts at θ = 2π when k is an integer, θ = 2dπ otherwise, and proceeds clockwise to θ = 0.

The circle, k = 1 (n = 1, d = 1). The rose is complete when θ = π is reached (half a revolution of the lighter gear).

The limaçon trisectrix, k = 1/3 (n = 1, d = 3), has one petal with two loops. The rose is complete when θ = 3π is reached (3/2 revolutions of the lighter gear).

The trifolium, k = 3 (n = 3, d = 1). The rose is complete when θ = π is reached (half a revolution of the lighter gear).

The 8 petals of the rose with k = 4/5 (n = 4, d = 5) is each, a single loop that intersect other petals. The rose is symmetric about the pole. The rose is complete at θ = 10π (five revolutions of the lighter gear).

== Roses with irrational number values for k ==
A rose curve specified with an irrational number for k has an infinite number of petals and will never complete. For example, the sinusoid r = a cos(πθ) has a period T = 2, so, it has a petal in the polar angle interval −1/2 ≤ θ ≤ 1/2 with a crest on the polar axis; however there is no other polar angle in the domain of the polar equation that will plot at the coordinates (a,0). Overall, roses specified by sinusoids with angular frequencies that are irrational constants form a dense set (that is, they come arbitrarily close to specifying every point in the disk r ≤ a).

== Rotations required to close the curve ==
The number of rotations (or total angular range) required for a rhodonea curve to complete one full closed figure depends on the ratio k = n/d. When k is an integer, the curve closes after π radians if k is odd, and after 2π radians if k is even. When k is a rational number, the total rotation needed for the curve to close is given by dπ/gcd(n,d) if nd is odd, and by 2dπ/gcd(n,d) otherwise. This formula determines how many radians (or loops) are required for the rose curve to complete a full pattern before repeating itself.

== See also ==
- Limaçon trisectrix - has the same shape as the rose with k = 1/3.
- Quadrifolium – a rose curve where k = 2.
- Maurer rose
- Rose (topology)
- Sectrix of Maclaurin
- Spirograph
