= Monte Inici =

Mountain in Italy

Coordinates: 38.0011°N 12.8592°E

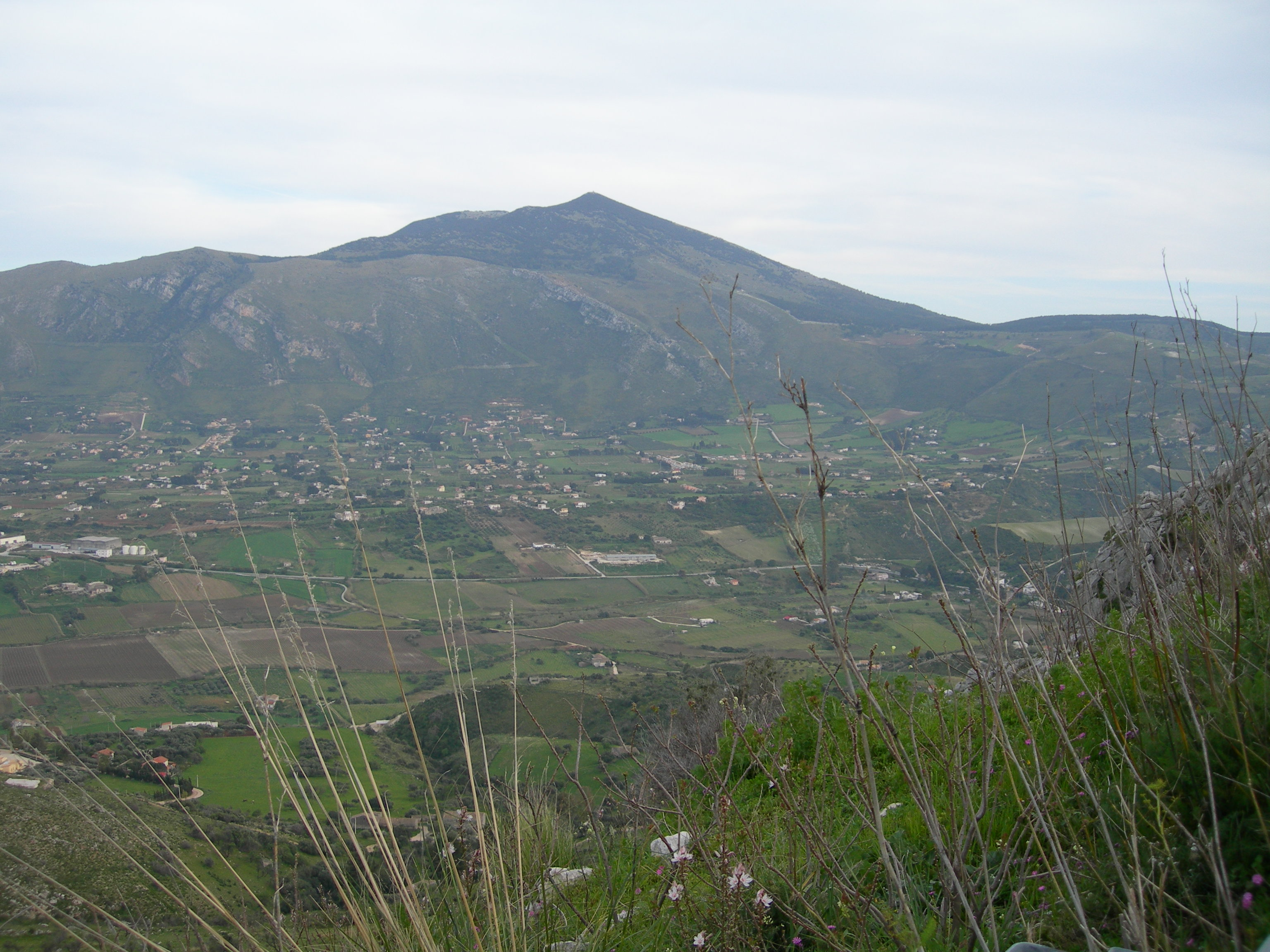
View of Monte Inici

Monte Inici is a mountain in the comune of Castellammare del Golfo, province of Trapani, Sicily. It stands approximately 1060 m above sea level, a few km south of the Golfo di Castellammare, an indentation of the Tyrrhenian Sea.

Monte Inici has been the site of numerous explorations and finds of fossils from the Middle Jurassic and Lower Cretaceous periods.

In the classical age, Monte Inici was the site of the ancient Greek settlement of Inykon in Magna Graecia, not to be confused with the larger town of Inycum (Inykon in Greek) in the southwestern part of Sicily.

In the 16th century Inici was a vast barony which included nine fiefs inside and belonged to the House of Sanclemente, a noble family from Trapani.

The shrub Ptilostemon greuteri is endemic to the mountain, where it is known from a single population in shrubland from 200 to 500 metres elevation.

The mountain is only accessible by foot. A mountain path climbs to the top from Castellammare del Golfo (app. km 12; hard).
