= Quadrifolium =

Rose curve with angular frequency 2

Rotated quadrifolium

Quadrifolium created with gears

The quadrifolium (also known as four-leaved clover) is a type of rose curve with an angular frequency of 2. It has the polar equation:

$$r = a\cos(2\theta), \,$$

with corresponding algebraic equation

$$(x^2+y^2)^3 = a^2(x^2-y^2)^2. \,$$

Rotated counter-clockwise by 45°, this becomes

$$r = a\sin(2\theta) \,$$

with corresponding algebraic equation

$$(x^2+y^2)^3 = 4a^2x^2y^2. \,$$

In either form, it is a plane algebraic curve of genus zero.

The dual curve to the quadrifolium is

$$(x^2-y^2)^4 + 837(x^2+y^2)^2 + 108x^2y^2 = 16(x^2+7y^2)(y^2+7x^2)(x^2+y^2)+729(x^2+y^2). \,$$

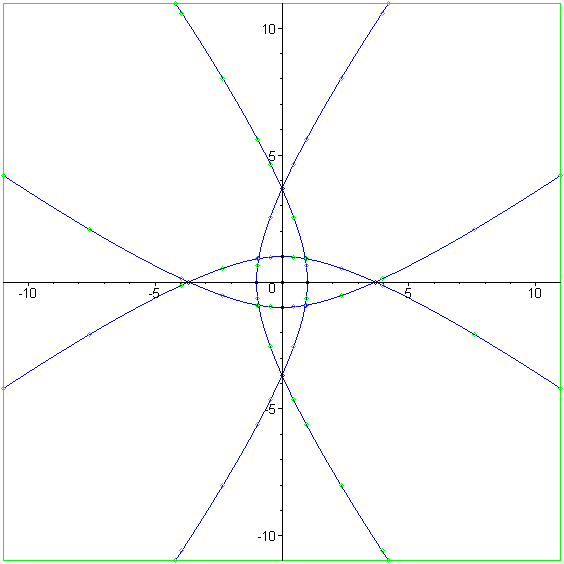
Dual quadrifolium

The area inside the quadrifolium is $\tfrac 12 \pi a^2$, which is exactly half of the area of the circumcircle of the quadrifolium. The perimeter of the quadrifolium is

$$8a\operatorname{E}\left(\frac{\sqrt{3}}{2}\right)=4\pi a\left(\frac{(52\sqrt{3}-90)\operatorname{M}'(1,7-4\sqrt{3})}{\operatorname{M}^2(1,7-4\sqrt{3})}+\frac{7-4\sqrt{3}}{\operatorname{M}(1,7-4\sqrt{3})}\right)$$

where $\operatorname{E}(k)$ is the complete elliptic integral of the second kind with modulus $k$, $\operatorname{M}$ is the arithmetic–geometric mean and $'$ denotes the derivative with respect to the second variable.
