= Maurer rose =

Curve formed by connecting intermittent points on a rose curve

A Maurer rose with n = 7 and d = 29

In geometry, Maurer rose is a curve consisting of some lines that connect some points on a rose curve. It was introduced by Peter M. Maurer in his article titled A Rose is a Rose....

== Definition ==
Let r = sin(nθ) be a rose in the polar coordinate system, where n is a positive integer. The rose has n petals if n is odd, and 2n petals if n is even.

We then take 361 points on the rose:

(sin(nk), k) (k = 0, d, 2d, 3d, ..., 360d),

where d is a positive integer and the angles are in degrees, not radians.

== Explanation ==
A Maurer rose of the rose r = sin(nθ) consists of the 360 lines successively connecting the above 361 points. Thus a Maurer rose is a polygonal curve with vertices on a rose.

A Maurer rose can be described as a closed route in the polar plane. A walker starts a journey from the origin, (0, 0), and walks along a line to the point (sin(nd), d). Then, in the second leg of the journey, the walker walks along a line to the next point, (sin(n·2d), 2d), and so on. Finally, in the final leg of the journey, the walker walks along a line, from (sin(n·359d), 359d) to the ending point, (sin(n·360d), 360d). The whole route is the Maurer rose of the rose r = sin(nθ). A Maurer rose is a closed curve since the starting point, (0, 0) and the ending point, (sin(n·360d), 360d), coincide.

The following figure shows the evolution of a Maurer rose (n = 2, d = 29°).

== Images ==
The following are some Maurer roses drawn with some values for n and d:

== Example implementation ==
Using Python:

import math, turtle

screen = turtle.Screen()
screen.setup(width=800, height=800, startx=0, starty=0)
screen.bgcolor("black")
pen = turtle.Turtle()
pen.speed(20)
n = 5
d = 97

pen.color("blue")
pen.pensize(0.5)
for theta in range(361):
    k = theta * d * math.pi / 180
    r = 300 * math.sin(n * k)
    x = r * math.cos(k)
    y = r * math.sin(k)
    pen.goto(x, y)

pen.color("red")
pen.pensize(4)
for theta in range(361):
    k = theta * math.pi / 180
    r = 300 * math.sin(n * k)
    x = r * math.cos(k)
    y = r * math.sin(k)
    pen.goto(x, y)
