= Menaechmus =

4th-century BC Greek mathematician

- Born: c. 380 BC; Alopeconnesus
- Died: c. 320 BC; Cyzicus^{[?]}

Menaechmus (Greek: Μέναιχμος, c. 380 – c. 320 BC) was an ancient Greek mathematician, geometer and philosopher born in Alopeconnesus or Prokonnesos in the Thracian Chersonese, who was known for his friendship with the renowned philosopher Plato and for his apparent discovery of conic sections and his solution to the then-long-standing problem of doubling the cube using the parabola and hyperbola.

== Life and work ==
Menaechmus is remembered by mathematicians for his discovery of the conic sections and his solution to the problem of doubling the cube. Menaechmus likely discovered the conic sections, that is, the ellipse, the parabola, and the hyperbola, as a by-product of his search for the solution to the Delian problem. Menaechmus knew that in a parabola y^{2} = Lx, where L is a constant called the latus rectum, although he was not aware of the fact that any equation in two unknowns determines a curve. He apparently derived these properties of conic sections and others as well. Using this information it was now possible to find a solution to the problem of the duplication of the cube by solving for the points at which two parabolas intersect, a solution equivalent to solving a cubic equation.

In modern notation, let $xy = 1$ be a hyperbola, and $y = ax^2 + bx + c$ be a parabola, then their intersections are the solutions to $ax^3 + bx^2 + cx = 1$. Now set $a = 1/2, b = 0, c = 0$.

There are few direct sources for Menaechmus's work; his work on conic sections is known primarily from an epigram by Eratosthenes, and the accomplishment of his brother (of devising a method to create a square equal in area to a given circle using the quadratrix), Dinostratus, is known solely from the writings of Proclus. Proclus also mentions that Menaechmus was taught by Eudoxus. There is a curious statement by Plutarch to the effect that Plato disapproved of Menaechmus achieving his doubled cube solution with the use of mechanical devices; the proof currently known appears to be purely algebraic.

Menaechmus was said to have been the tutor of Alexander the Great; this belief derives from the following anecdote: supposedly, once, when Alexander asked him for a shortcut to understanding geometry, he replied "O King, for traveling over the country, there are royal road and roads for common citizens, but in geometry there is one road for all." However, this quotation is first attested by Stobaeus, about 500 AD, and so whether Menaechmus really taught Alexander is uncertain.

Where precisely he died is uncertain as well, though modern scholars believe that he eventually expired in Cyzicus.

== Sources ==
- Boyer, Carl B. (1991). A History of Mathematics (Second ed.). John Wiley & Sons, Inc. ISBN 0-471-54397-7.
- Cooke, Roger (1997). The History of Mathematics: A Brief Course. Wiley-Interscience. ISBN 0-471-18082-3.
- François Lasserre (1987). De Léodamas de Thasos à Philippe d'Oponte : témoignages et fragments. pp. 115–24. ISBN 8870881369.
