= Transcendental curve =

Mathematical structure

In analytical geometry, a transcendental curve is a curve that is not an algebraic curve. Here for a curve, C, what matters is the point set (typically in the plane) underlying C, not a given parametrisation. For example, the unit circle is an algebraic curve (pedantically, the real points of such a curve); the usual parametrisation by trigonometric functions may involve those transcendental functions, but certainly the unit circle is defined by a polynomial equation. (The same remark applies to elliptic curves and elliptic functions; and in fact to curves of genus > 1 and automorphic functions.)

The properties of algebraic curves, such as Bézout's theorem, give rise to criteria for showing curves actually are transcendental. For example, an algebraic curve C either meets a given line L in a finite number of points, or possibly contains all of L. Thus a curve intersecting any line in an infinite number of points, while not containing it, must be transcendental. This applies not just to sinusoidal curves, therefore; but to large classes of curves showing oscillations.

The term is originally attributed to Leibniz.

== Further examples ==
- Cycloid
- Trigonometric functions
- Logarithmic and exponential functions
- Archimedes' spiral
- Logarithmic spiral
- Catenary
- Quadratrix of Hippias
