= Euclidean field =

Euclidean field may refer to

- Euclidean ordered field
- Euclidean number field
