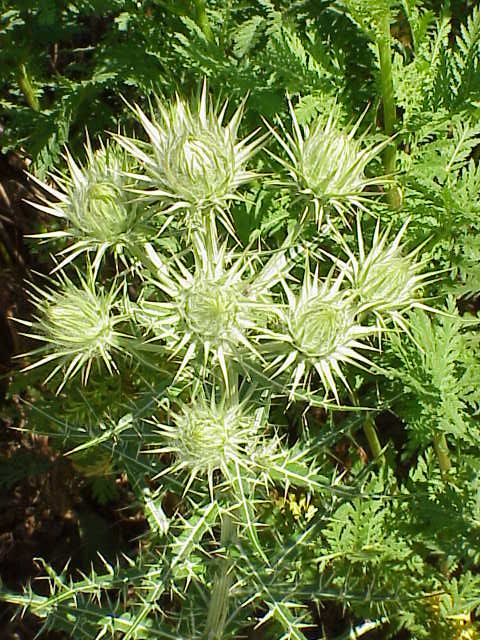
- Ptilostemon diacanthus

Scientific classification
- Kingdom: Plantae
- Clade: Tracheophytes
- Clade: Angiosperms
- Clade: Eudicots
- Clade: Asterids
- Order: Asterales
- Family: Asteraceae
- Subfamily: Carduoideae
- Tribe: Cardueae
- Subtribe: Carduinae
- Genus: Ptilostemon; Cass.

Synonyms
- List: Lamyra (Cass.) Cass.; Chamaepeuce DC.; Koechlea Endl.; Platyraphium Cass.

= Ptilostemon =

Genus of plants

Ptilostemon is a genus of thistle in the tribe Cardueae within the family Asteraceae. It includes 15 species native to the Mediterranean Basin and the Caucasus.

== Species ==
The following species are recognised in the genus Ptilostemon:

- Ptilostemon abylensis (Maire) Greuter – Morocco
- Ptilostemon afer (Jacq.) Greuter – Turkey, Balkan Peninsula
- Ptilostemon casabonae (L.) Greuter – France, Italy
- Ptilostemon chamaepeuce (L.) Less. – eastern Mediterranean
- Ptilostemon diacanthus (Labill.) Greuter – Turkey, Syria, Lebanon
- Ptilostemon dyricola (Maire) Greuter – Morocco
- Ptilostemon echinocephalus (Willd.) Greuter – Crimea, Turkey, Republic of Georgia
- Ptilostemon gnaphaloides (Cirillo) Soják – France, Italy, Greece, Turkey, Libya
- Ptilostemon × grandei (Petr.) Greuter (P. niveus × P. strictus) – Italy
- Ptilostemon greuteri Raimondo & Domina – Sicily
- Ptilostemon hispanicus (Lam.) Greuter – Spain
- Ptilostemon leptophyllus (Pau & Font Quer) Greuter – Morocco
- Ptilostemon niveus (C.Presl) Greuter – Italy
- Ptilostemon × pabotii Greuter (P. chamaepeuce var camptolepis × P. diacanthus subsp. turcicus) – western Syria
- Ptilostemon × parisiensis Greuter (P. afer × P. chamaepeuce var. camptolepis) – Syria
- Ptilostemon rhiphaeus (Pau & Font Quer) Greuter – Morocco, Algeria
- Ptilostemon stellatus (L.) Greuter – France, Italy, Greece, Albania, Croatia, Montenegro
- Ptilostemon strictus (Ten.) Greuter – Italy, Greece, Balkan Peninsula
- Ptilostemon × tauricola (Boiss. & Balansa) Greuter – Turkey
