= Midpoint theorem (triangle) =

Geometric theorem involving midpoints on a triangle

$$\begin{align} &\text{D and E midpoints of AC and BC}\\ \Rightarrow \, &DE \parallel AB\text{ and } 2|DE|=|AB|\end{align}$$

The midpoint theorem, midsegment theorem, or midline theorem states that if the midpoints of two sides of a triangle are connected, then the resulting line segment will be parallel to the third side and have half of its length. The midpoint theorem generalizes to the intercept theorem, where rather than using midpoints, both sides are partitioned in the same ratio.

The converse of the theorem is true as well. That is if a line is drawn through the midpoint of triangle side parallel to another triangle side then the line will bisect the third side of the triangle.

The triangle formed by the three parallel lines through the three midpoints of sides of a triangle is called its medial triangle.

== Proof ==
=== Proof by construction ===
Proof

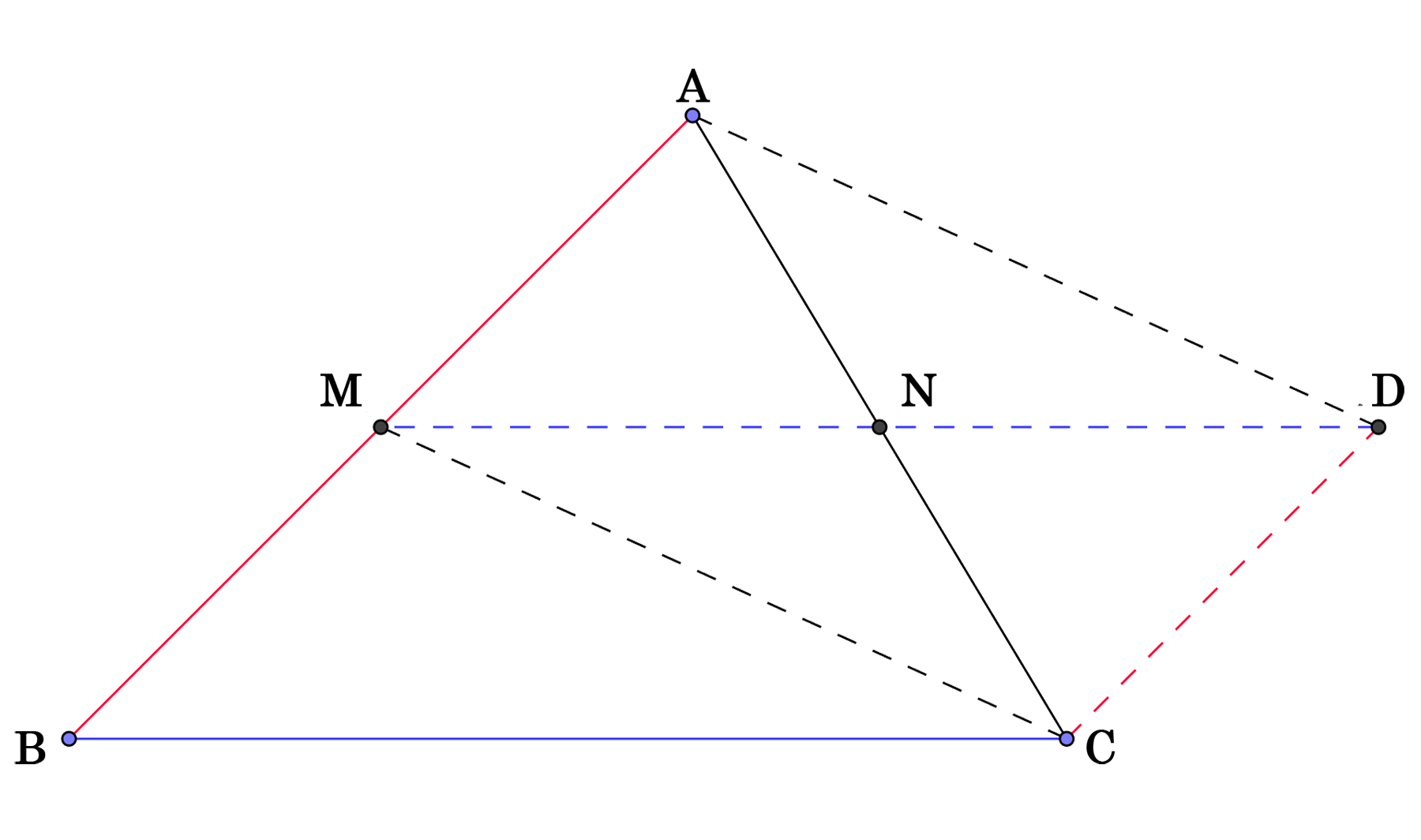

Given: In a $\triangle ABC$ the points M and N are the midpoints of the sides AB and AC respectively.

Construction: MN is extended to D where MN=DN, join C to D.

To Prove:

- $MN\parallel BC$
- $MN={1\over 2}BC$

Proof:

- $AN=CN$ (given)
- $\angle ANM=\angle CND$ (vertically opposite angle)
- $MN=DN$ (constructible)

Hence by Side angle side.

$$\triangle AMN\cong\triangle CDN$$

Therefore, the corresponding sides and angles of congruent triangles are equal

- $AM=BM=CD$
- $\angle MAN=\angle DCN$

Transversal AC intersects the lines AB and CD and alternate angles ∠MAN and ∠DCN are equal. Therefore

- $AM\parallel CD\parallel BM$

Hence BCDM is a parallelogram. BC and DM are also equal and parallel.

- $MN\parallel BC$
- $MN={1\over 2}MD={1\over 2}BC$,

Q.E.D.

=== Proof by similar triangles ===
Proof

Let D and E be the midpoints of AC and BC.

To prove:

- $DE\parallel AB$,
- $DE = \frac{1}{2}AB$.

Proof:

$\angle C$ is the common angle of $\triangle ABC$ and $\triangle DEC$.

Since DE connects the midpoints of AC and BC, $AD=DC$, $BE=EC$ and $\frac{AC}{DC}=\frac{BC}{EC}=2.$ As such, $\triangle ABC$ and $\triangle DEC$ are similar by the SAS criterion.

Therefore, $\frac{AB}{DE}=\frac{AC}{DC}=\frac{BC}{EC}=2,$ which means that $DE=\frac{1}{2}AB.$

Since $\triangle ABC$ and $\triangle DEC$ are similar, $\angle CDE = \angle CAB$, which means that $AB\parallel DE$.

Q.E.D.

== See also ==
- Median of the trapezoid theorem
