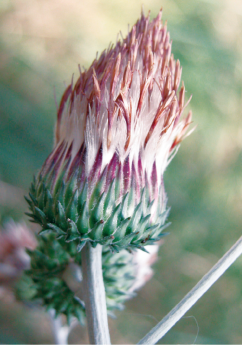

Conservation status
- Critically Endangered (IUCN 3.1)

Scientific classification
- Kingdom: Plantae
- Clade: Tracheophytes
- Clade: Angiosperms
- Clade: Eudicots
- Clade: Asterids
- Order: Asterales
- Family: Asteraceae
- Tribe: Cardueae
- Subtribe: Carduinae
- Genus: Ptilostemon
- Species: P. greuteri

Binomial name
- Ptilostemon greuteri Raimondo & Domina

= Ptilostemon greuteri =

Species of flowering plant

Ptilostemon greuteri is a species of flowering plant in the family Asteraceae. It is a shrub endemic to western Sicily.

Ptilostemon greuteri is a woody thistle which generally grows from 0.5 to 2 meters tall, and occasionally to 3.5 meters tall. It is the largest species and has the largest leaves in the genus. It is endemic to Monte Inici near Castellammare del Golfo in Trapani Province of northwestern Sicily. It was known from a single population in Cappellone Valley, where it grows in shrubland on rocky slopes, on cliffs, and at cliff bases from 200 to 500 metres elevation. A second population was discovered in 2022, growing in similar conditions. The species' area of occupancy (AOO) is less than 4 km^{2} and it has an estimated population of about 250 plants. The species is threatened with a continuing decline in the extent and quality of its habitat, from fires and from abandonment traditional grazing practices which has allowed the shrub canopy to close. It is assessed as critically endangered by the IUCN.
