= Inycum =

Inycum or Inycus (Ancient Greek: τὸ Ἴνυκτον, Steph. Byz., or ἡ Ἴνυξ, Herod., or either τὸ Ἰνυκόν or ἡ Ἰνυκός, Plato.), was an ancient town of Sicily, situated in the southwest of the island, on the river Hypsas (today the Belice).

It is principally known from its connection with the mythical legends concerning Minos and Daedalus; the capital of the Sicanian prince Cocalus, who afforded a shelter to the fugitive Daedalus against the Cretan monarch, being placed by some writers at Inycum, and by others at Camicus. (Paus. vii. 4. § 6; Charax, ap. Steph. B. s. v. Καμικός.)

It is mentioned in historical times by Herodotus as the place of confinement to which Scythes, the ruler of Zancle (modern Messina), was sent by Hippocrates, who had taken him prisoner. (Herod. vi. 23, 24.) Aelian, who copies the narrative of Herodotus, represents Scythes as a native of Inycum; but this is probably a mistake. (Ael. V. H. viii. 17.)

Plato speaks of Inycum as still in existence in his time, but quite a small place (Χωρίον πάνυ σμικρόν); notwithstanding which he makes the sophist Hippias boast that he had derived from it a sum of 20 minae. (Plat. Hipp. M. p. 282, e.) It is evident that it always continued to be an inconsiderable place, and was probably a mere dependency of Selinus. Hence we never again meet with its name, though Stephanus tells us that this was still preserved on account of the excellence of its wine.

(Steph. B. s. v. Ἴνυκον; Aesych. s. v.) Vibius Sequester is the only author that affords any clue to its position, by telling us that the river Hypsas (the modern Belice) flowed by it (Vib. Sequest. p. 12, according to Cluver's emendation); but further than this its site cannot be determined.
