= Cochleoid =

Spiral curve of the form r = a*sin(θ)/θ

$r=\frac{\sin \theta}{\theta}, -20<\theta<20$

cochleoid (solid) and its polar inverse (dashed)

A flexible pole is fixed upright at one end and bent over to always form a circular arc. The other end then traces out a Cochleoid.

In geometry, a cochleoid is a snail-shaped curve similar to a strophoid which can be represented by the polar equation

$$r=\frac{a \sin \theta}{\theta},$$

the Cartesian equation

$$(x^2+y^2)\arctan\frac{y}{x}=ay,$$

or the parametric equations

$$x=\frac{a\sin t\cos t}{t}, \quad y=\frac{a\sin^2 t}{t}.$$

The cochleoid is the inverse curve of Hippias' quadratrix.
