= Quadratrix of Hippias =

Curve where spinning and moving lines cross

Quadratrix (red); snapshot of E and F having completed 60% of their motions

The quadratrix or trisectrix of Hippias (also called the quadratrix of Dinostratus) is a curve which is created by a uniform motion. It is traced out by the crossing point of two lines, one moving by translation at a uniform speed, and the other moving by rotation around one of its points at a uniform speed. An alternative definition as a parametric curve leads to an equivalence between the quadratrix, the image of the Lambert W function, and the graph of the function $y=x\cot x$.

The discovery of this curve is attributed to the Greek sophist Hippias of Elis, around 420 BC. Historians of mathematics have suggested that Hippias used it to solve the angle trisection problem, hence its name as a trisectrix. Later around 350 BC Dinostratus used it to solve the problem of squaring the circle, hence its name as a quadratrix. Dinostratus's theorem, used by Dinostratus to square the circle, relates an endpoint of the curve to the value of π. Both angle trisection and squaring the circle can be solved using a compass, a straightedge, and a given copy of this curve; however, they cannot be solved with compass and straightedge alone. Although a dense set of points on the curve can be constructed by compass and straightedge, allowing these problems to be approximated, the whole curve cannot be constructed in this way.

The quadratrix of Hippias is a transcendental curve. It is one of several curves used in Greek mathematics for squaring the circle.

== Definitions ==
=== By moving lines ===
Consider a square $ABCD$, and an inscribed quarter circle arc centered at $A$ with radius equal to the side of the square. Let $E$ be a point that travels with a constant angular velocity along the arc from $D$ to $B$, and let $F$ be a point that travels simultaneously with a constant velocity from $D$ to $A$ along line segment $\overline{AD}$, so that $E$ and $F$ start at the same time at $D$ and arrive at the same time at $B$ and $A$. Then the quadratrix is defined as the locus of the intersection of line segment $\overline{AE}$ with the parallel line to $\overline{AB}$ through $F$.

=== Helicoid section ===
Suppose that a plane contains two lines, one moving by rotation and the other moving by translation within the plane, and that this whole ensemble is also moving linearly, in a direction perpendicular to the plane, through three-dimensional space. Then, the combined motion of the plane with the translating line will trace out an inclined plane, while the combined motion of the plane with the rotating line will trace out a helicoid. The point where the two lines intersect will trace out a space curve whose projection onto the original plane is the quadratrix. Pappus of Alexandria observed that this construction can be reversed: intersecting a helicoid with an appropriately chosen inclined plane, and then projecting the curve of intersection onto a plane, can form a quadratrix.

=== Parametric equation ===
The quadratrix as a plane curve for side length $a=1$, given by the parametric formula for −∞ < t < ∞. The singularities of the parametric formula, for values of t that are nonzero integer multiples of π, correspond to even integer y-coordinates, at which the curve jumps from negative to positive x-coordinates.

Choose Cartesian coordinates so that the defining square $ABCD$ of the quadratrix lies in the positive quadrant, with $A$ at the origin $(0,0)$ and $B$ at point $(a,0)$ where $a$ is the side length of the square. For this definition, it is convenient to reverse the motion of the two defining lines of the quadratrix so that they start together on the $x$-axis at time $t=0$ and end intersecting at $D$ at time $t=\tfrac\pi2$; this reversal does not change the curve that the lines trace out. Then the quadratrix can be described by parametric equations that give the coordinates of each point on the curve as a function of the time parameter $t$, as
$$x(t) = \frac{2a}{\pi} t\cot(t)$$
and
$$y(t) = \frac{2a}{\pi} t,$$
where $\cot$ is the cotangent function.

This description can also be used to give an analytical rather than a geometric definition of the quadratrix and to extend it to values of $t$ beyond the $(0,\tfrac{\pi}{2}]$ interval. The extended curve does however remain undefined for values of $t$ that are integer multiples of $\pi$, because $\cot(t)$ is singular at those values. At $t=0$, the singularity is removable by evaluating it using the limit $\lim_{t\to 0} t \cot(t)=1$, obtained as the ratio of the identity function and tangent function using l'Hôpital's rule. Removing the singularity in this way and extending the parametric definition to negative values of $t$ yields a continuous planar curve on the range of parameter values $-\pi<t<\pi$. This part of the curve can be seen as the central $\supset$-shaped branch of the figure.

When reflected left to right and scaled appropriately in the complex plane, the quadratrix forms the image of the real axis for one branch of Lambert W function. The images for other branches consist of curves above and below the quadratrix, and the real axis itself.

=== As the graph of a function ===
Quadratrix as the graph of a function for $a=1$

To describe the quadratrix as the graph of an unbranched function, it is advantageous to swap the $y$-axis and the $x$-axis, that is to place the side $\overline{AB}$ on the $y$-axis rather than on the $x$-axis. Then the quadratrix forms the graph of the function
$$f(x) = x \cdot \cot\left(\frac{\pi}{2a} \cdot x \right).$$

== Angle trisection ==
Quadratrix compass

Angle trisection

The trisection of an arbitrary angle using only compass and straightedge is impossible. However, if the quadratrix is allowed as an additional tool, it is possible to divide an arbitrary angle into $n$ equal segments and hence a trisection ($n=3$) becomes possible. In practical terms the quadratrix can be drawn with the help of a template or a quadratrix compass (see drawing).

By the definition of the quadratrix, the traversed angle is proportional to the traversed segment of the associated squares' side. Therefore, dividing that segment on the side into $n$ equal parts yields a partition of the associated angle into $n$ equal parts as well. Dividing the line segment into $n$ equal parts with ruler and compass is possible due to the intercept theorem.

In more detail, to divide a given angle $\angle BAE$ (at most 90°) into any desired number of equal parts, construct a square $ABCD$ over its leg $\overline{AB}$. The other leg of the angle intersects the quadratrix of the square in a point $G$ and the parallel line to the leg $\overline{AB}$ through $G$ intersects the side $\overline{AD}$ of the square in $F$. Now the segment $\overline{AF}$ corresponds to the angle $\angle BAE$ and due to the definition of the quadratrix any division of the segment $\overline{AF}$ into $n$ equal segments yields a corresponding division of the angle $\angle BAE$ into $n$ equal angles. To divide the segment $\overline{AF}$ into $n$ equal segments, draw any ray starting at $A$ with $n$ equal segments (of arbitrary length) on it. Connect the endpoint $O$ of the last segment to $F$ and draw lines parallel to $\overline{OF}$ through all the endpoints of the remaining $n-1$ segments on $\overline{AO}$. These parallel lines divide the segment $\overline{AF}$ into $n$ equal segments. Now draw parallel lines to $\overline{AB}$ through the endpoints of those segments on $\overline{AF}$, intersecting the trisectrix. Connecting their points of intersection to $A$ yields a partition of angle $\angle BAE$ into $n$ equal angles.

Since not all points of the trisectrix can be constructed with circle and compass alone, it is really required as an additional tool beyond the compass and straightedge. However it is possible to construct a dense subset of the trisectrix by compass and straightedge. In this way, while one cannot assure an exact division of an angle into $n$ parts without a given trisectrix, one can construct an arbitrarily close approximation to the trisectrix and therefore also to the division of the angle by compass and straightedge alone.

== Squaring the circle ==
Squaring of a quarter circle with radius 1

Like angle trisection, squaring the circle with compass and straightedge alone is impossible. However, if one allows the quadratrix of Hippias as an additional construction tool, the squaring of the circle becomes possible due to Dinostratus's theorem relating an endpoint of this circle to the value of π. One can use this theorem to construct a square with the same area as a quarter circle. Another square with twice the side length has the same area as the full circle.

=== Dinostratus's theorem ===
According to Dinostratus's theorem the quadratrix divides one of the sides of the associated square in a ratio of $\tfrac{2}{\pi}$. More precisely, for the square $ABCD$ used to define the curve, let $J$ be the endpoint of the curve on edge $AB$. Then
$$\frac{\overline{AJ}}{\overline{AB}}=\frac{2}{\pi},$$
as can be seen from the parametric equation for the quadratrix at $t=0$ and the limiting behavior of the function controlling its $x$-coordinate at that parameter value, $\lim_{t\to 0}t\cot t=1$.

The point $J$, where the quadratrix meets the side $\overline{AB}$ of the associated square, is one of the points of the quadratrix that cannot be constructed with ruler and compass alone and not even with the help of the quadratrix compass. This is due to the fact that (as Sporus of Nicaea already observed) the two uniformly moving lines coincide and hence there exists no unique intersection point. However relying on the generalized definition of the quadratrix as a function or planar curve allows for $J$ being a point on the quadratrix.

=== Construction ===
For a given quarter circle with radius $r$ one constructs the associated square $ABCD$ with side length $r$. The quadratrix intersect the side $\overline{AB}$ in $J$ with $\left|\overline{AJ}\right|=\tfrac{2}{\pi}r$. Now one constructs a line segment $\overline{JK}$ of length $r$ being perpendicular to $\overline{AB}$. Then the line through $A$ and $K$ intersects the extension of the side $\overline{BC}$ in $L$ and from the intercept theorem follows $\left|\overline{BL}\right|=\tfrac{\pi}{2}r$. Extending $\overline{AB}$ to the right by a new line segment $\left|\overline{BO}\right|=\tfrac{r}{2}$ yields the rectangle $BLNO$ with sides $\overline{BL}$ and $\overline{BO}$ the area of which matches the area of the quarter circle. This rectangle can be transformed into a square of the same area with the help of Euclid's geometric mean theorem. One extends the side $\overline{ON}$ by a line segment $\left|\overline{OQ}\right|=\left|\overline{BO}\right|=\tfrac{r}{2}$ and draws a half circle to right of $\overline{NQ}$, which has $\overline{NQ}$ as its diameter. The extension of $\overline{BO}$ meets the half circle in $\overline{R}$ and due to Thales' theorem the line segment $\overline{OR}$ is the altitude of the right-angled triangle $QNR$. Hence the geometric mean theorem can be applied, which means that $\overline{OR}$ forms the side of a square $OUSR$ with the same area as the rectangle $BLNO$ and hence as the quarter circle.

== Other properties ==
For a quadratrix constructed from a unit square, the area under the quadratrix is
$$\frac{2\ln 2}{\pi}\approx 0.44127.$$

Inverting the quadratrix by a circle centered at the axis of the rotating line that defines it produces a cochleoid, and in the same way inverting the cochleoid produces a quadratrix.

== History ==
The quadratrix of Hippias is one of several curves used in Greek mathematics for squaring the circle, the most well-known for this purpose. Another is the Archimedean spiral, used to square the circle by Archimedes.

It is mentioned in the works of Proclus (412–485), Pappus of Alexandria (3rd and 4th centuries) and Iamblichus (c. 240 – c. 325). Proclus names Hippias as the inventor of a curve called a quadratrix. Pappus only mentions how a curve named a quadratrix was used by Dinostratus, Nicomedes and others to square the circle. He relays the objections of Sporus of Nicaea to this construction, but neither mentions Hippias nor attributes the invention of the quadratrix to a particular person. Iamblichus just writes in a single line, that a curve called a quadratrix was used by Nicomedes to square the circle.

From Proclus' name for the curve, it is conceivable that Hippias himself used it for squaring the circle or some other curvilinear figure. However, most historians of mathematics assume that Hippias invented the curve, but used it only for the trisection of angles. According to this theory, its use for squaring the circle only occurred decades later and was due to mathematicians like Dinostratus and Nicomedes. This interpretation of the historical sources goes back to the German mathematician and historian Moritz Cantor.

Rüdiger Thiele claims that François Viète used the trisectrix to derive Viète's formula, an infinite product of nested radicals published by Viète in 1593 that converges to $2/\pi$. However, other sources instead view Viète's formula as an elaboration of a method of nested polygons used by Archimedes to approximate $\pi$. In his 1637 book La Géométrie, René Descartes classified curves either as "geometric", admitting a precise geometric construction, or if not as "mechanical"; he gave the quadratrix as an example of a mechanical curve. In modern terminology, roughly the same distinction may be expressed by saying that it is a transcendental curve rather than an algebraic curve. Isaac Newton used trigonometric series to determine the area enclosed by the quadratrix.

== Related phenomena ==
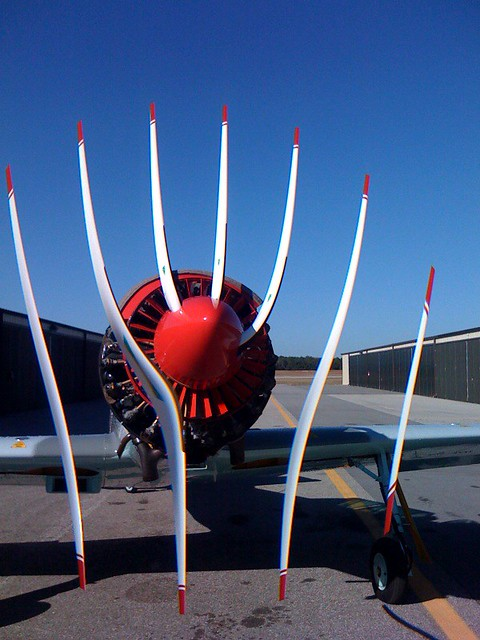
Rolling shutter image of an airplane propeller

When a camera with a rolling shutter takes a photograph of a quickly rotating object, such as a propeller, curves resembling the quadratrix of Hippias may appear, generated in an analogous way to the quadratrix: these curves are traced out by the points of intersection of the rotating propeller blade and the linearly moving scan line of the camera. Different curves may be generated depending on the angle of the propeller at the time when the scan line crosses its axis of rotation (rather than coinciding with the scan line at that time for the quadratrix). A similar visual phenomenon was also observed in the 19th century by Peter Mark Roget when the spoked wheel of a moving cart or train is viewed through the vertical slats of a fence or palisade; it is called Roget's palisade illusion.
