= Trisectrix =

Curve which could be used to trisect an angle with compass and straightedge

In geometry, a trisectrix is a curve which can be used to trisect an arbitrary angle with ruler and compass and this curve as an additional tool. Such a method falls outside those allowed by compass and straightedge constructions, so they do not contradict the well known theorem which states that an arbitrary angle cannot be trisected with that type of construction. There is a variety of such curves and the methods used to construct an angle trisector differ according to the curve. Examples include:

- Limaçon trisectrix (some sources refer to this curve as simply the trisectrix.)
- Trisectrix of Maclaurin
- Tschirnhausen cubic (a.k.a. Catalan's trisectrix and L'Hôpital's cubic)
- Deslanges trisectrix
- Cubic parabola (the graph of the cube function)
- Hyperbola with eccentricity 2
- Parabola
- Cycloid of Ceva

A related concept is a sectrix, which is a curve which can be used to divide an arbitrary angle by any integer. Examples include:

- Archimedean spiral
- Quadratrix of Hippias
- Sine curve

== See also ==
- Sectrix of Maclaurin, a family of curves different members of which can divide angles into different numbers of parts
- Neusis construction, the use of a marked ruler in constructions such as angle trisection
- Quadratrix, a curve used for squaring the circle
