= Euclidean ordered field =

Ordered field where every nonnegative element is a square

In mathematics, a Euclidean field is an ordered field K for which every non-negative element is a square: that is, x ≥ 0 in K implies that x = y^{2} for some y in K.

The constructible numbers form a Euclidean field. It is the smallest Euclidean field, as every Euclidean field contains it as an ordered subfield. In other words, the constructible numbers form the Euclidean closure of the rational numbers.

== Properties ==
- Every Euclidean field is an ordered Pythagorean field, but the converse is not true.
- If E/F is a finite extension, and E is Euclidean, then so is F. This "going-down theorem" is a consequence of the Diller–Dress theorem.

== Examples ==
- The real constructible numbers, those (signed) lengths which can be constructed from a rational segment by ruler and compass constructions, form a Euclidean field.

Every real closed field is a Euclidean field. The following examples are also real closed fields.

- The real numbers $\mathbb{R}$ with the usual operations and ordering form a Euclidean field.
- The field of real algebraic numbers $\mathbb{R}\cap\mathbb{\overline Q}$ is a Euclidean field.
- The field of hyperreal numbers is a Euclidean field.

== Counterexamples ==
- The rational numbers $\mathbb Q$ with the usual operations and ordering do not form a Euclidean field. For example, 2 is not a square in $\mathbb Q$ since the square root of 2 is irrational. By the going-down result above, no algebraic number field can be Euclidean.
- The complex numbers $\mathbb C$ do not form a Euclidean field since they cannot be given the structure of an ordered field.

== Euclidean closure ==
The Euclidean closure of an ordered field K is an extension of K in the quadratic closure of K which is maximal with respect to being an ordered field with an order extending that of K. It is also the smallest subfield of the algebraic closure of K that is a Euclidean field and is an ordered extension of K.
