= Intercept theorem =

Theorem concerning ratios of line segments

The intercept theorem, also known as Thales's theorem, basic proportionality theorem or side splitter theorem, is an important theorem in elementary geometry about the ratios of various line segments that are created if two rays with a common starting point are intercepted by a pair of parallels. It is equivalent to the theorem about ratios in similar triangles. It is traditionally attributed to Greek mathematician Thales. It was known to the ancient Babylonians and Egyptians, although its first known proof appears in Euclid's Elements. A mechanical device which produces geometrically-similar shapes is known as a pantograph.

== Formulation of the theorem ==
Intercept theorem with rays

Suppose S is the common starting point of two rays, and two parallel lines are intersecting those two rays (see figure). Let A, B be the intersections of the first ray with the two parallels, such that B is further away from S than A, and similarly C, D are the intersections of the second ray with the two parallels such that D is further away from S than C. In this configuration the following statements hold:

1. The ratio of any two segments on the first ray equals the ratio of the according segments on the second ray:
  $\frac{| SA |}{| AB |} =\frac{| SC |}{ | CD |}$, $\frac{| SB |}{| AB |} =\frac{| SD |}{| CD |}$, $\frac{| SA |}{| SB |} =\frac{| SC |}{| SD |}$
2. The ratio of the two segments on the same ray starting at S equals the ratio of the segments on the parallels:
  $\frac{| SA |}{| SB |} = \frac{| SC |}{| SD |} =\frac{| AC |}{| BD |}$
3. The converse of the first statement is true as well, i.e. if the two rays are intercepted by two arbitrary lines and $\frac{| SA |}{| AB |} =\frac{| SC |}{| CD |}$ holds then the two intercepting lines are parallel. However, the converse of the second statement is not true (see graphic for a counterexample).
  $\tfrac{|SA|}{|SB|}=\tfrac{|AC|}{|BD|}$ does not necessarily imply AC is parallel to BD.

== Extensions and conclusions ==
Intercept theorem with a pair of intersecting lines

Intercept theorem with more than two lines

The first two statements remain true if the two rays get replaced by two lines intersecting in $S$. In this case there are two scenarios with regard to $S$, either it lies between the 2 parallels (X figure) or it does not (V figure). If $S$ is not located between the two parallels, the original theorem applies directly. If $S$ lies between the two parallels, then a reflection of $A$ and $C$ at $S$ yields V figure with identical measures for which the original theorem now applies.

The third statement (converse) however does not remain true for lines instead of rays. However, if one replaces ratio of lengths with signed ratios of directed line segments, all statements of the intercept theorem including the converse remain valid for lines as well. More precisely if $A$ and $B$ are two points on a line and $C$ and $D$ are two points on the same line or on a parallel line, then the signed ratio $\frac{AB}{CD}$ is $\frac{|AB|}{|CD|}$ if the direction from $A$ to $B$ is the same as the direction from $C$ to $D,$ and is $-\frac{|AB|}{|CD|}$ otherwise.

If there are more than two rays starting at $S$ or more than two lines intersecting at $S$, then each parallel contains more than one line segment and the ratio of two line segments on one parallel equals the ratio of the according line segments on the other parallel. For instance if there's a third ray starting at $S$ and intersecting the parallels in $E$ and $F$, such that $F$ is further away from $S$ than $E$, then the following equalities hold:

$\frac{| AE |}{| BF |} =\frac{| EC |}{ | FD |}$ , $\frac{| AE |}{ | EC |} =\frac{| BF |}{| FD |}$

For the second equation the converse is true as well, that is if the 3 rays are intercepted by two lines and the ratios of the according line segments on each line are equal, then those 2 lines must be parallel.

== Related concepts ==
=== Homotheties ===
An homothety of positive ratio k with center O maps a point A to the point B located on the ray OA such that

$$\frac{|OB|}{|OA|}=k.$$

The converse of the theorem implies that a homothety transforms a line in a parallel line.

Conversely, the direct statement of the intercept theorem implies that a geometric transformation is always a homothety of center O, if it fixes the lines passing through O and transforms every other line into a parallel line.

=== Similarity and similar triangles ===
Arranging two similar triangles, so that the intercept theorem can be applied

The intercept theorem is closely related to similarity. It is equivalent to the concept of similar triangles, i.e. it can be used to prove the properties of similar triangles and similar triangles can be used to prove the intercept theorem. By matching identical angles you can always place two similar triangles in one another so that you get the configuration in which the intercept theorem applies; and conversely the intercept theorem configuration always contains two similar triangles.

=== Scalar multiplication in vector spaces ===
In a normed vector space, the axioms concerning the scalar multiplication (in particular $\lambda \cdot (\vec{a}+\vec{b})=\lambda \cdot \vec{a}+ \lambda \cdot \vec{b}$ and $\|\lambda \vec{a}\|=|\lambda|\cdot\ \|\vec{a}\|$) ensure that the intercept theorem holds. One has $\frac{ \| \lambda \cdot \vec{a} \| }{ \| \vec{a} \|} =\frac{\|\lambda\cdot\vec{b}\|}{\|\vec{b}\|} =\frac{\|\lambda\cdot(\vec{a}+\vec{b}) \|}{\|\vec{a}+\vec{b}\|} =|\lambda|$

== Applications ==
=== Algebraic formulation of compass and ruler constructions ===
There are three famous problems in elementary geometry which were posed by the Greeks in terms of compass and straightedge constructions:

1. Trisecting the angle
2. Doubling the cube
3. Squaring the circle

It took more than 2000 years until all three of them were finally shown to be impossible. This was achieved in the 19th century with the help of algebraic methods, that had become available by then. In order to reformulate the three problems in algebraic terms using field extensions, one needs to match field operations with compass and straightedge constructions (see constructible number). In particular it is important to assure that for two given line segments, a new line segment can be constructed, such that its length equals the product of lengths of the other two. Similarly one needs to be able to construct, for a line segment of length $a$, a new line segment of length $a^{-1}$. The intercept theorem can be used to show that for both cases, that such a construction is possible.

Construction of a product	Construction of an inverse

=== Dividing a line segment in a given ratio ===
To divide an arbitrary line segment $\overline{AB}$ in a $m:n$ ratio, draw an arbitrary angle in A with $\overline{AB}$ as one leg. On the other leg construct $m+n$ equidistant points, then draw the line through the last point and B and parallel line through the mth point. This parallel line divides $\overline{AB}$ in the desired ratio. The following graphic shows the partition of a line segment $\overline{AB}$ in a $5:3$ ratio.

=== Measuring and survey ===
==== Height of the Cheops pyramid ====
Measuring pieces

Computing C and D

According to some historical sources the Greek mathematician Thales applied the intercept theorem to determine the height of the Cheops' pyramid. The following description illustrates the use of the intercept theorem to compute the height of the pyramid. It does not, however, recount Thales' original work, which was lost.

Thales measured the length of the pyramid's base and the height of his pole. Then at the same time of the day he measured the length of the pyramid's shadow and the length of the pole's shadow. This yielded the following data:

- height of the pole (A): 1.63 m
- shadow of the pole (B): 2 m
- length of the pyramid base: 230 m
- shadow of the pyramid: 65 m

From this he computed

$$C = 65~\text{m}+\frac{230~\text{m}}{2}=180~\text{m}$$

Knowing A, B and C he was now able to apply the intercept theorem to compute

$$D=\frac{C \cdot A}{B}=\frac{1.63~\text{m} \cdot 180~\text{m}}{2~\text{m}}=146.7~\text{m}$$

==== Measuring the width of a river ====
The intercept theorem can be used to determine a distance that cannot be measured directly, such as the width of a river or a lake, the height of tall buildings or similar. The graphic to the right illustrates measuring the width of a river. The segments $|CF|$,$|CA|$,$|FE|$ are measured and used to compute the wanted distance $|AB|=\frac{|AC||FE|}{|FC|}$.

=== Parallel lines in triangles and trapezoids ===
The intercept theorem can be used to prove that a certain construction yields parallel line (segment)s.

If the midpoints of two triangle sides are connected then the resulting line segment is parallel to the third triangle side (Midpoint theorem of triangles).	If the midpoints of the two non-parallel sides of a trapezoid are connected, then the resulting line segment is parallel to the other two sides of the trapezoid.

== Historical aspects ==
The theorem is traditionally attributed to the Greek mathematician Thales of Miletus, who may have used some form of the theorem to determine heights of pyramids in Egypt and to compute the distance of ship from the shore.

== Proof ==
An elementary proof of the theorem uses triangles of equal area to derive the basic statements about the ratios (claim 1). The other claims then follow by applying the first claim and contradiction.

=== Claim 1 ===

Notation: For a triangle the vertical bars ($|\ldots|$) denote its area and for a line segment its length.

Proof: Since $CA\parallel BD$, the altitudes of $\triangle CDA$ and $\triangle CBA$ are of equal length. As those triangles share the same baseline, their areas are identical. So we have $| \triangle CDA|=| \triangle CBA|$. Now, we add the area of triangle $\triangle SCA$ to both sides of this equality. On the left-hand side, the union of $\triangle CDA$ and $\triangle SCA$ forms triangle $\triangle SDA$, and on the right-hand side, the union of $\triangle CBA$ and $\triangle SCA$ forms triangle $\triangle SCB$. Hence, we obtain $| \triangle SCB|=| \triangle SDA|$ as well. This yields

$\frac{| \triangle SCA|}{|\triangle CDA|}=\frac{|\triangle SCA|}{|\triangle CBA|}$ and $\frac{| \triangle SCA|}{|\triangle SDA|}=\frac{|\triangle SCA|}{|\triangle SCB|}$

Plugging in the formula for triangle areas ($\tfrac{\text{baseline} \cdot \text{altitude}}{2}$) transforms that into

$\frac{|SC||AF|}{|CD||AF|}=\frac{|SA||EC|}{|AB||EC|}$ and $\frac{|SC||AF|}{|SD||AF|}=\frac{|SA||EC|}{|SB||EC|}$

Canceling the common factors results in:

(a) $\, \frac{|SC|}{|CD|}=\frac{|SA|}{|AB|}$ and (b) $\, \frac{|SC|}{|SD|}=\frac{|SA|}{|SB|}$

Now use (b) to replace $|SA|$ and $|SC|$ in (a): $\frac{\frac{|SA||SD|}{|SB|}}{|CD|}=\frac{\frac{|SB||SC|}{|SD|}}{|AB|}$

Using (b) again this simplifies to: (c) $\, \frac{|SD|}{|CD|}=\frac{|SB|}{|AB|}$ $\, \square$

=== Claim 2 ===

Draw an additional parallel to $SD$ through A. This parallel intersects $BD$ in G. Then one has $|AC|=|DG|$ and due to claim 1 $\frac{|SA|}{|SB|}=\frac{|DG|}{|BD|}$ and therefore $\frac{|SA|}{|SB|}=\frac{|AC|}{|BD|}$

$\square$

=== Claim 3 ===

Assume $AC$ and $BD$ are not parallel. Then the parallel line to $AC$ through $D$ intersects $SA$ in $B_{0}\neq B$. Since $|SB|:|SA|=|SD|:|SC|$ is true, we have
$|SB|=\frac{|SD||SA|}{|SC|}$
and on the other hand from claim 1 we have
$|SB_{0}|=\frac{|SD||SA|}{|SC|}$.
So $B$ and $B_{0}$ are on the same side of $S$ and have the same distance to $S$, which means $B=B_{0}$. This is a contradiction, so the assumption could not have been true, which means $AC$ and $BD$ are indeed parallel $\square$
