= Quadratrix =

Curve with axes measuring the area of another curve

In geometry, a quadratrix (from Latin quadrator 'squarer') is a curve that can be used for quadrature, constructing the area under another curve.

For instance, in integral calculus as developed by Gottfried Wilhelm Leibniz, the quadratrix of a curve (the graph of a function) was another curve, the graph of its indefinite integral: the area under the first curve could be constructed from the $y$-coordinates of points on the quadratrix. The property of being an indefinite integral was expressed geometrically, as an equality between the $y$-coordinates on the first curve and the subnormals of the second, the difference between the $x$-coordinate of a point on the curve and the $x$-coordinate of the point where a perpendicular line to the curve crosses the $x$-axis.

Certain specific curves are called a quadratrix. The two most famous curves of this class are the quadratrix of Hippias and the quadratrix of E. W. Tschirnhaus, which can be used for squaring the circle, the construction of a square with the area of a given circle.

== Quadratrix of Dinostratus ==
The quadratrix of Hippias was well known to the ancient Greek geometers, and is mentioned by Proclus, who ascribes the invention of the curve to a contemporary of Socrates, probably Hippias of Elis. Dinostratus, a Greek geometer and disciple of Plato, discussed the curve, and showed how it effected a mechanical solution of squaring the circle. Pappus, in his Collections, treats its history, and gives two methods by which it can be generated.

Quadratrix of Dinostratus (in red)

One construction is as follows. DAB is a quadrant in which the line DA and the arc DB are divided into the same number of equal parts. Radii are drawn from the centre of the quadrant to the points of division of the arc, and these radii are intersected by the lines drawn parallel to AB and through the corresponding points on the radius D̅A̅. The locus of these intersections is the quadratrix.

The point where the curve crosses the y-axis has y = 2a/π; therefore, if it were possible to accurately construct the curve, one could construct a line segment whose length is a rational multiple of 1/π, leading to a solution of the classical problem of squaring the circle. Since this is impossible with compass and straightedge, the quadratrix in turn cannot be constructed with compass and straightedge. An accurate construction of the quadratrix would also allow the solution of another classical problem known to be impossible with compass and straightedge: trisecting an angle.

== Quadratrix of Tschirnhaus ==
Tschirnhaus' quadratrix (red), Hippias quadratrix (dotted)

The quadratrix of Tschirnhaus is constructed by dividing the arc and radius of a quadrant in the same number of equal parts as before. The mutual intersections of the lines drawn from the points of division of the arc parallel to DA, and the lines drawn parallel to AB through the points of division of DA, are points on the quadratrix. The Cartesian equation is $y = a \cos\!\big(\tfrac{\pi x}{2a}\big)$. The curve is periodic, and cuts the x-axis at the points $x = (2n - 1)a$, $n$ being an integer; the maximum values of $y$ are $a$. Its properties are similar to those of the quadratrix of Dinostratus.

== Other quadratrices ==
Other curves that have historically been used to square the circle include the Archimedean spiral and the cochleoid.
