= Hippias =

5th century BC Greek sophist

Hippias of Elis (/ˈhɪpiəs/; Greek: Ἱππίας ὁ Ἠλεῖος; late 5th century BC) was a Greek sophist, and a contemporary of Socrates. With an assurance characteristic of the later sophists, he claimed to be regarded as an authority on all subjects, and lectured on poetry, grammar, history, politics, mathematics, and much else. Most current knowledge of him is derived from Plato, who characterizes him as vain and arrogant.

== Life ==
Hippias was born at Elis in the mid 5th-century BC (c. 460 BC) and was thus a younger contemporary of Protagoras and Socrates. He lived at least as late as Socrates (399 BC). He was a disciple of Hegesidamus. Owing to his talent and skill, his fellow-citizens availed themselves of his services in political matters, and in a diplomatic mission to Sparta. But he was in every respect like the other sophists of the time: he travelled about in various towns and districts of Greece for the purpose of teaching and public speaking. The two dialogues of Plato, the Hippias major and the Hippias minor characterize him as vain and arrogant. The Hippias major (the authorship of this work by Plato is sometimes doubted) concerns the question about the beautiful, and purposely puts the knowledge and presumption of Hippias in a ludicrous light. The Hippias minor discusses the deficiency of human knowledge, and characterizes Hippias as ridiculously vain.

== Work ==
Hippias was a man of very extensive knowledge, and he occupied himself not only with rhetorical, philosophical, and political studies, but was also well versed in poetry, music, mathematics, painting and sculpture, and he claimed some practical skill in the ordinary arts of life, for he used to boast of wearing on his body nothing that he had not made himself with his own hands, such as his seal-ring, his cloak, and shoes. He was credited with a lost work known as the Olympionikō̂n Anagraphḗ (Ὀλυμπιονικῶν Ἀναγραφή) which computed Coroebus's victory as occurring in 776 BC and became the basis of all later lists of the Olympiads and their victors. On the other hand, his knowledge always appears superficial, he does not enter into the details of any particular art or science, and is satisfied with certain generalities, which enabled him to speak on everything without a thorough knowledge of any. This arrogance, combined with ignorance, is the main cause which provoked Plato to his severe criticism of Hippias, as the sophist enjoyed a very extensive reputation, and thus had a large influence upon the education of the youths of the higher classes. Plutarch also criticized Hippias in The Life of Numa in Parallel Lives when writing about the chronology of Numa's relationship with Pythagoras, mentioning that the chronology was based on the Olympionikō̂n Anagraphḗ and stating that Hippias had no authoritative basis on his work. A mathematical discovery ascribed to Hippias is sometimes called the quadratrix of Hippias.

His great skill seems to have consisted in delivering grand show speeches; and Plato has him arrogantly declaring that he would travel to Olympia, and there deliver before the assembled Greeks an oration on any subject that might be proposed to him; and Philostratus in fact speaks of several such orations delivered at Olympia, and which created great sensation. If such speeches were published by Hippias, then no specimen has come down to us. Plato claims he wrote epic poetry, tragedies, dithyrambs, and various orations, as well as works on grammar, music, rhythm, harmony, and a variety of other subjects. He seems to have been especially fond of choosing antiquarian and mythical subjects for his show speeches. Athenaeus mentions a work of Hippias under the title Synagoge which is otherwise unknown. An epigram of his is preserved in Pausanias.

== Natural law ==
Hippias is credited with originating the idea of natural law. This ideal began at first during the 5th century BC. According to Hippias, natural law was never to be superseded as it was universal. Hippias saw natural law as a habitual entity that humans take part in without pre-meditation. He regarded the elite in states as indistinguishable from one another and thus they should perceive each other as so. Because of this, he reasons, they should consider and treat each other as a society of a unanimous state. These ideas were passed on through Cynicism and Stoicism, later being the foundation for turning Roman law in legislation. Along with natural law, Hippias also wrote about self-sufficiency as a binding principle. He used this principle in his teachings as he gathered knowledge in numerous subjects, so as to be never outwitted or have his reputation questioned.

== See also ==
- Cynicism (philosophy)
- Natural Law
- Quadratrix of Hippias
- Roman Law
- Self-sufficiency
- Stoicism
