= 4,294,967,295 =

4294967295
- List of numbers; Integers; ← 10^{0} 10^{1} 10^{2} 10^{3} 10^{4} 10^{5} 10^{6} 10^{7} 10^{8} 10^{9} 10^{10} 10^{11} 10^{12} 10^{13}
- Cardinal: four billion two hundred ninety-four million nine hundred sixty-seven thousand two hundred ninety-five
- Ordinal: 4294967295th (four billion two hundred ninety-four million nine hundred sixty-seven thousand two hundred ninety-fifth)
- Factorization: 3 × 5 × 17 × 257 × 65537
- Greek numeral: $\stackrel{\mu\beta\theta\upsilon\koppa\digamma}{\Mu}$͵ζσϟε´
- Roman numeral: N/A, n/a
- Binary: 11111111111111111111111111111111_{2}
- Ternary: 102002022201221111210_{3}
- Senary: 1550104015503_{6}
- Octal: 37777777777_{8}
- Duodecimal: 9BA461593_{12}
- Hexadecimal: FFFFFFFF_{16}

The number 4,294,967,295 is a whole number equal to 2^{32} − 1. It is a perfect totient number, meaning it is equal to the sum of its iterated totients. It follows 4,294,967,294 and precedes 4,294,967,296. It has a factorization of $3 \cdot 5 \cdot 17 \cdot 257 \cdot 65537$, which are the first five Fermat primes.

In computing, 4,294,967,295 is the highest unsigned (that is, not negative) 32-bit integer, which makes it the highest possible number a 32-bit system can store in a word sized register.

== In geometry ==
Since the prime factors of 2^{32} − 1 are exactly the five known Fermat primes, this number is the largest known odd value n for which a regular n-sided polygon is constructible using compass and straightedge. Equivalently, it is the largest known odd number n for which the angle $2\pi/n$ can be constructed, or for which $\cos(2\pi/n)$ can be expressed in terms of square roots.

Not only is 4,294,967,295 the largest known odd number of sides of a constructible polygon, but since constructibility is related to factorization, the list of odd numbers n for which an n-sided polygon is constructible begins with the list of factors of 4,294,967,295. If there are no more Fermat primes, then the two lists are identical. Namely (assuming 65537 is the largest Fermat prime), an odd-sided polygon is constructible if and only if it has 3, 5, 15, 17, 51, 85, 255, 257, 771, 1285, 3855, 4369, 13107, 21845, 65535, 65537, 196611, 327685, 983055, 1114129, 3342387, 5570645, 16711935, 16843009, 50529027, 84215045, 252645135, 286331153, 858993459, 1431655765, or 4294967295 sides. If there are more numbers in this list, they must be at least 2^{2^{33}}+1 (approximately 10^{2585827973}), because every intervening Fermat number is known to be composite.

== In computing ==
The number 4,294,967,295, equivalent to the hexadecimal value FFFFFFFF_{16}, is the maximum value for a 32-bit unsigned integer in computing. It is therefore the maximum value for a variable declared as a 32-bit unsigned integer (usually indicated by the unsigned codeword). The presence of the value may reflect an error, overflow condition, or missing value.

This value is also the largest memory address for CPUs using a 32-bit address bus. Being an odd value, its appearance may reflect an erroneous (misaligned) memory address. Such a value may also be used as a sentinel value to initialize newly allocated memory for debugging purposes.

Internet Protocol version 4 (IPv4) uses a 32-bit addresses which limits the address space to 4294967296 (2^{32}) unique addresses.

In 2004, 800 aircraft over Los Angeles were put in danger when the LA Air Route Traffic Control Center lost radio contact with all of the aircraft for about three hours, delaying 400 flights and cancelling 600, due to a computer design that kept time by starting at 4,294,967,295 milliseconds and counting down to zero, or 49 days, 17 hours, 2 minutes and 47.295 seconds. Some people were aware that the system needed to be restarted at least every 30 days, but the root problem was the choice of such a small number.

On May 4, 2021, Nasdaq temporarily suspended price feeds for Berkshire Hathaway Class A shares (Nasdaq: BRK.A), which reached $421,000. Nasdaq stores stock prices as 32-bit unsigned integers in increments of ten-thousandths of a dollar, so the maximum price that could be represented was $429,496.7295.

== See also ==
- 2,147,483,647 (2^{31}-1)
- Power of two
- Equilateral triangle
- Pentagon
- Heptadecagon (17-sides)
- 257-gon
- 65537-gon
