= 65537-gon =

Polygon with 65537 sides

Regular 65537-gon
- A regular 65537-gon
- Type: Regular polygon
- Edges and vertices: 65537
- Schläfli symbol: {65537}
- Symmetry group: Dihedral (D_{65537}), order 2×65537
- Internal angle (degrees): ≈179.994 507°
- Properties: Convex, cyclic, equilateral, isogonal, isotoxal
- Dual polygon: Self

In geometry, a 65537-gon is a polygon with 65,537 (i.e., 2^{16} + 1) sides. The sum of the interior angles of any non-self-intersecting 65537-gon is 11,796,300°.

== Regular 65537-gon ==
The area of a regular 65537-gon is (with t = edge length)

$$A = \frac{65537}{4} t^2 \cot \frac{\pi}{65537}$$

The perimeter of a regular 65537-gon differs from that of the circumscribed circle by about 15 parts per billion.

== Construction ==
The regular 65537-gon (one with all sides equal and all angles equal) is of interest for being a constructible polygon: that is, it can be constructed using a compass and an unmarked straightedge. This is because 65,537 is a Fermat prime, being of the form 2^{2^{n}} + 1 (in this case n = 4). Thus, the values $\cos \frac{\pi}{65537}$ and $\cos \frac{2\pi}{65537}$ are 32768-degree algebraic numbers, and like any constructible numbers, they can be written in terms of square roots and no higher-order roots.

Although it was known to Carl Friedrich Gauss by 1801 that the regular 65537-gon was constructible, the first explicit construction of a regular 65537-gon was given by Johann Gustav Hermes (1894). The construction is very complex; Hermes spent 10 years completing the 200-page manuscript. Another method involves the use of at most 1332 Carlyle circles, and the first stages of this method are pictured below. This method faces practical problems, as one of these Carlyle circles solves the quadratic equation x^{2} + x − 16384 = 0 (16384 being 2^{14}).

== Symmetry ==
The regular 65537-gon has D_{65537} symmetry, order 131074. Since 65537 is a prime number, D_{65537} has 2 proper cyclic subgroups: Z_{65537}, and Z_{2}, which correspond to the subgroup generated by a rotation and a reflection respectively.

== 65537-gram ==
A 65537-gram is a 65,537-sided star polygon. As 65,537 is prime, there are 32,767 regular forms generated by Schläfli symbols $\{{65537}/{n}\}$ for all integers 2 ≤ n ≤ 32768 as $\left\lfloor \frac{65537}{2} \right\rfloor = 32768$.

== See also ==
- Circle
- Equilateral triangle
- Pentagon
- Heptadecagon (17-sides)
- 257-gon

== Bibliography ==
- Weisstein, Eric W. "65537-gon". MathWorld.
- Robert Dixon Mathographics. New York: Dover, p. 53, 1991.
- Benjamin Bold, Famous Problems of Geometry and How to Solve Them New York: Dover, p. 70, 1982. ISBN 978-0486242972
- H. S. M. Coxeter Introduction to Geometry, 2nd ed. New York: Wiley, 1969. Chapter 2, Regular polygons
- Leonard Eugene Dickson Constructions with Ruler and Compasses; Regular Polygons Ch. 8 in Monographs on Topics of Modern Mathematics
- Relevant to the Elementary Field (Ed. J. W. A. Young). New York: Dover, pp. 352–386, 1955.
