= String girdling Earth =

Mathematical puzzle

Visualisation showing that the length added to the circumference (blue) is dependent only on the additional radius (red) and not the original circumference (grey)

String girdling Earth is a mathematical puzzle with a counterintuitive solution. In a version of this puzzle, string is tightly wrapped around the equator of a perfectly spherical Earth. If the string should be raised 1 metre (roughly 3 ft 3 in) off the ground, all the way along the equator, how much longer would the string be?

Alternatively, 1 metre (3 ft 3 in) of string is spliced into the original string, and the extended string rearranged so that it is at a uniform height above the equator. The question that is then posed is whether the gap between string and Earth will allow the passage of a car, a cat or a thin knife blade.

== Solution ==
Visual analogue using a square showing that additional string is added only at the corners: four circular arcs adding up to a circle with radius equal to the offset

As the string must be raised all along the entire 40,000 km (25,000 mi) circumference, one might expect several kilometres of additional string. Surprisingly, the answer is 2π m or around 6.3 metres (21 ft).

In the second phrasing, considering that 1 metre (3 ft 3 in) is almost negligible compared with the 40,000 km (25,000 mi) circumference, the first response may be that the new position of the string will be no different from the original surface-hugging position. The answer is that a cat will easily pass through the gap, the size of which will be 1/2π metres or about 16 cm (6.3 in).

Even more surprising is that the size of the sphere or circle around which the string is spanned is irrelevant, and may be anything from the size of an atom to the Milky Way — the result depends only on the amount it is raised. Moreover, as in the coin-rolling problem, the shape the string girdles need not be a circle: 2π times the offset is added when it is any simple polygon or closed curve which does not intersect itself. If the shape is complex, 2π times the offset, times the absolute value of its turning number must be added.

This diagram gives a visual analogue using a square: regardless of the size of the square, the added perimeter is the sum of the four blue arcs, a circle with the same radius as the offset.

More formally, let c be the Earth's circumference, r its radius, Δc the added string length and Δr the added radius. As a circle of radius R has a circumference of 2πR ,

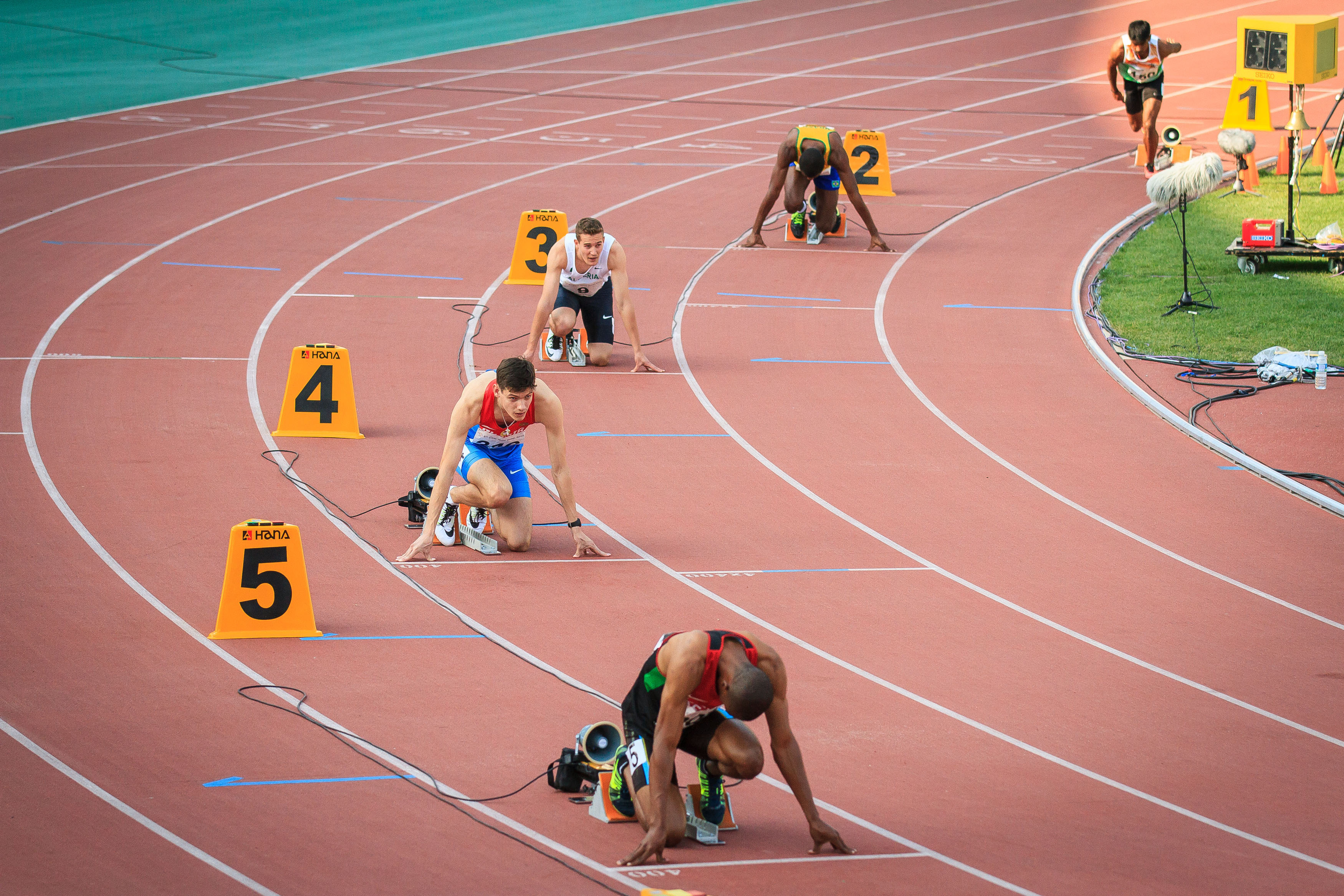

Photograph showing the offset between starting lines of an athletics track

$$\begin{align}
c       + \varDelta c & = 2 \pi (r +       \varDelta r)
\\    2 \pi r + \varDelta c & = 2 \pi  r + 2 \pi \varDelta r
\\              \varDelta c & =            2 \pi \varDelta r
\\ \therefore\; \varDelta r & = \frac{\varDelta c}{2 \pi}
\end{align}$$

regardless of the value of c .

== Implications ==
This observation means that an athletics track has the same offset between starting lines on each lane, equal to 2π times the width of the lane, whether the circumference of the inside lane is the standard 400 m (1,300 ft) or the size of a galaxy.

As aircraft fly at high altitude to save fuel due to lower drag, the formula shows that a Δa rise in altitude lengthens a flight along an entire great circle by 2π Δa. For example, each additional 1000 feet adds 2 × π × 1000 ≈ 6283 feet (about 1 nautical mile) around the whole Earth. In SI units, each kilometre altitude increases the distance by 15.7 cm, per kilometre travelled. The higher efficiency far exceeds the negligible distance added.

== See also ==
- Visual calculus, an intuitive way to solve this type of problem, originally applied to finding the area of an annulus, given only its chord length
- Napkin ring problem, another problem where the radius of a sphere is counter-intuitively irrelevant
