= Carlyle circle =

Circle associated with a quadratic equation

In mathematics, a Carlyle circle is a certain circle in a coordinate plane associated with a quadratic equation; it is named after Thomas Carlyle. The circle has the property that the solutions of the quadratic equation are the horizontal coordinates of the intersections of the circle with the horizontal axis. Carlyle circles have been used to develop ruler-and-compass constructions of regular polygons.

== Definition ==
Carlyle circle of the quadratic equation x^{2} − sx + p = 0.

Given a quadratic equation in the form

x^{2} − sx + p = 0

the circle associated to it in the coordinate plane having the line segment joining the points A(0, 1) and B(s, p) as a diameter is called the Carlyle circle of the quadratic equation.

== Defining property ==
The defining property of the Carlyle circle can be established thus: the equation of the circle having the line segment AB as diameter is

x(x − s) + (y − 1)(y − p) = 0.

The abscissas of the points where the circle intersects the x-axis are the roots of the equation (obtained by setting y = 0 in the equation of the circle)

x^{2} − sx + p = 0.

== Construction of regular polygons ==
Construction of regular pentagon using Carlyle circles

Construction of a regular heptadecagon using Carlyle circles

Construction of a regular 257-gon using Carlyle circles

=== Regular pentagon ===
The problem of constructing a regular pentagon is equivalent to the problem of constructing the roots of the equation

z^{5} − 1 = 0.

One root of this equation is z_{0} = 1 which corresponds to the point P_{0}(1, 0). Removing the factor corresponding to this root, the other roots turn out to be roots of the equation

z^{4} + z^{3} + z^{2} + z + 1 = 0.

These roots can be represented in the form ω, ω^{2}, ω^{3}, ω^{4} where ω = exp (2iπ/5). Let these correspond to the points P_{1}, P_{2}, P_{3}, P_{4}. Letting

p_{1} = ω + ω^{4}, p_{2} = ω^{2} + ω^{3}

we have

p_{1} + p_{2} = −1, p_{1}p_{2} = −1. (These can be quickly shown to be true by direct substitution into the quartic above and noting that ω^{6} = ω, and ω^{7} = ω^{2}.)

So p_{1} and p_{2} are the roots of the quadratic equation

x^{2} + x − 1 = 0.

The Carlyle circle associated with this quadratic has a diameter with endpoints at (0, 1) and (−1, −1) and center at (−1/2, 0). Carlyle circles are used to construct p_{1} and p_{2}. From the definitions of p_{1} and p_{2} it also follows that

p_{1} = 2cos(2π/5), p_{2} = 2cos(4π/5).

These are then used to construct the points P_{1}, P_{2}, P_{3}, P_{4}.

This detailed procedure involving Carlyle circles for the construction of regular pentagons is given below.

1. Draw a circle in which to inscribe the pentagon and mark the center point O.
2. Draw a horizontal line through the center of the circle. Mark one intersection with the circle as point B.
3. Construct a vertical line through the center. Mark one intersection with the circle as point A.
4. Construct the point M as the midpoint of O and B.
5. Draw a circle centered at M through the point A. This is the Carlyle circle for x^{2} + x − 1 = 0. Mark its intersection with the horizontal line (inside the original circle) as the point W and its intersection outside the circle as the point V. These are the points p_{1} and p_{2} mentioned above.
6. Draw a circle of radius OA and center W. It intersects the original circle at two of the vertices of the pentagon.
7. Draw a circle of radius OA and center V. It intersects the original circle at two of the vertices of the pentagon.
8. The fifth vertex is the intersection of the horizontal axis with the original circle.

=== Regular heptadecagon ===
There is a similar method involving Carlyle circles to construct regular heptadecagons. The figure to the right illustrates the procedure.

=== Regular 257-gon ===
To construct a regular 257-gon using Carlyle circles, as many as 24 Carlyle circles are to be constructed. One of these is the circle to solve the quadratic equation x^{2} + x − 64 = 0.

=== Regular 65537-gon ===
There is a procedure involving Carlyle circles for the construction of a regular 65537-gon. However there are practical problems for the implementation of the procedure; for example, it requires the construction of the Carlyle circle for the solution of the quadratic equation x^{2} + x − 2^{14} = 0.

== History ==
Carlyle's solution to Leslie's problem. The black line segment is divided in two segments in such a way that the two segments form a rectangle (green) being of equal area to another given rectangle (red).

According to Howard Eves (1911–2004), the mathematician John Leslie (1766–1832) described the geometric construction of roots of a quadratic equation with a circle in his book Elements of Geometry and noted in 1817 that this idea was provided by his former student Thomas Carlyle (1795–1881). However while the description in Leslie's book contains an analogous circle construction, it was presented solely in elementary geometric terms without the notion of a Cartesian coordinate system or a quadratic function and its roots:

To divide a straight line, whether internally or externally, so that the rectangle under its segments shall be equivalent to a given rectangle.

— John Leslie, Elements of Geometry, prop. XVII, p. 176

In 1867 the Austrian engineer Eduard Lill published a graphical method to determine the roots of a polynomial (Lill's method). If it is applied on a quadratic function, then it yields the trapezoid figure from Carlyle's solution to Leslie's problem (see graphic) with one of its sides being the diameter of the Carlyle circle. In an article from 1925 G. A. Miller pointed out that a slight modification of Lill's method applied to a normed quadratic function yields a circle that allows the geometric construction of the roots of that function and gave the explicit modern definition of what was later to be called Carlyle circle.

Eves used the circle in the modern sense in one of the exercises of his book Introduction to the History of Mathematics (1953) and pointed out the connection to Leslie and Carlyle. Later publications started to adopt the names Carlyle circle, Carlyle method or Carlyle algorithm, though in German speaking countries the term Lill circle (Lill-Kreis) is used as well. DeTemple used in 1989 and 1991 Carlyle circles to devise compass-and-straightedge constructions for regular polygons, in particular the pentagon, the heptadecagon, the 257-gon and the 65537-gon. Ladislav Beran described in 1999 how the Carlyle circle can be used to construct the complex roots of a normed quadratic function.
