= Lill's method =

Graphical method for the real roots of a polynomial

Finding roots −2, −1 (repeated root), and −1/3 of the quartic 3x^{4}+13x^{3}+19x^{2}+11x+2 using Lill's method. Black segments are labeled with their lengths (coefficients in the equation), while each colored line with initial slope m and the same endpoint corresponds to a real root.

In mathematics, Lill's method is a visual method of finding the real roots of a univariate polynomial of any degree. It was developed by Austrian engineer Eduard Lill in 1867. A later paper by Lill dealt with the problem of complex roots.

Lill's method involves drawing a path of straight line segments making right angles, with lengths equal to the coefficients of the polynomial. The roots of the polynomial can then be found as the slopes of other right-angle paths, also connecting the start to the terminus, but with vertices on the lines of the first path.

== Description of the method ==
Finding roots −1/2, −1/√2, and 1/√2 of the cubic 4x^{3} + 2x^{2} − 2x − 1, showing how negative coefficients and extended segments are handled. Each number shown on a colored line is the negative of its slope and hence a real root of the polynomial.

To employ the method, a diagram is drawn starting at the origin. A line segment is drawn rightwards by the magnitude of the leading coefficient, so that with a negative coefficient, the segment will end left of the origin. From the end of the first segment, another segment is drawn upwards by the magnitude of the second coefficient, then left by the magnitude of the third, then down by the magnitude of the fourth, and so on. The sequence of directions (not turns) is always rightward, upward, leftward, downward, then repeating itself. Thus, each turn is counterclockwise. The process continues for every coefficient of the polynomial, including zeros, with negative coefficients "walking backwards." The final point reached, at the end of the segment corresponding to the equation's constant term, is the terminus.

A line is then launched from the origin at some angle θ, reflected off of each line segment at a right angle (not necessarily the "natural" angle of reflection), and refracted at a right angle through the line through each segment (including a line for the zero coefficients) when the angled path does not hit the line segment on that line. The vertical and horizontal lines are reflected off or refracted through in the following sequence: the line containing the segment corresponding to the coefficient of x^{n−1}, then of x^{n−2} etc. Choosing θ so that the path lands on the terminus, −tan(θ) is a root of this polynomial. For every real zero of the polynomial, there will be one unique initial angle and path that will land on the terminus. A quadratic with two real roots, for example, will have exactly two angles that satisfy the above conditions.

For complex roots, one must also find a series of similar triangles, but with the vertices of the root path displaced from the polynomial path by a distance equal to the imaginary part of the root. In this case, the root path will not be rectangular.

=== Explanation ===
The construction in effect evaluates the polynomial according to Horner's method. For the polynomial $a_n x^n+a_{n-1}x^{n-1}+a_{n-2}x^{n-2}+ \cdots$, the values of $a_n x$, $(a_n x+a_{n-1})x$, $((a_n x+a_{n-1})x+a_{n-2})x$, ... are successively generated as distances between the vertices of the polynomial and root paths. For a root of the polynomial, the final value is zero, so the last vertex coincides with the polynomial path terminus.

=== Additional properties ===
A solution line giving a root is similar to the Lill's construction for the polynomial with that root removed, because the visual construction is analogous to the synthetic division of the polynomial by a linear (root) monic (Ruffini's rule).

From the symmetry of the diagram, it can easily be seen that the roots of the reversed polynomial are the reciprocals of the original roots.

The construction can also be done using clockwise turns instead of counterclockwise turns. When a path is interpreted using the other convention, it corresponds to the mirrored polynomial (every odd coefficient's sign is changed), and the roots are negated.

When the right-angle path is traversed in the other direction but with the same direction convention, it corresponds to the reversed mirrored polynomial, and the roots are the negative reciprocals of the original roots.

=== Finding quadratic roots using Thales's theorem ===
Finding roots of 3x^{2} + 5x − 2

Lill's method can be used with Thales's theorem to find the real roots of a quadratic polynomial.

In this example with 3x^{2} + 5x − 2, the polynomial's line segments are first drawn in black, as above. A circle is drawn with the straight line segment joining the start and end points forming a diameter.

According to Thales's theorem, the triangle containing these points and any other point on the circle is a right triangle. Intersects of this circle with the middle segment of Lill's method, extended if needed, thus define the two angled paths in Lill's method, colored blue and red.

The negatives of the gradients of their first segments, m, yield the real roots 1/3 and −2.

=== Finding roots using paper folding ===
Find roots of 3x^{3} + 2x^{2} − 7x + 2

In 1936, Margherita Piazzola Beloch showed how Lill's method could be adapted to solve cubic equations using paper folding. If simultaneous folds are allowed, then any nth-degree equation with a real root can be solved using n − 2 simultaneous folds.

In this example with 3x^{3} + 2x^{2} − 7x + 2, the polynomial's line segments are first drawn on a sheet of paper (black). Lines passing through reflections of the start and end points in the second and third segments, respectively (faint circle and square), and parallel to them (grey lines), are drawn.

For each root, the paper is folded until the start point (black circle) and end point (black square) are reflected onto these lines. The axis of reflection (dash-dot line) defines the angled path corresponding to the root (blue, purple, and red). The negative of the gradients of their first segments, m, yield the real roots 1/3, 1, and −2.

== See also ==
- Carlyle circle, which is based on a slightly modified version of Lill's method for a normed quadratic.
