= Johann Gustav Hermes =

German mathematician

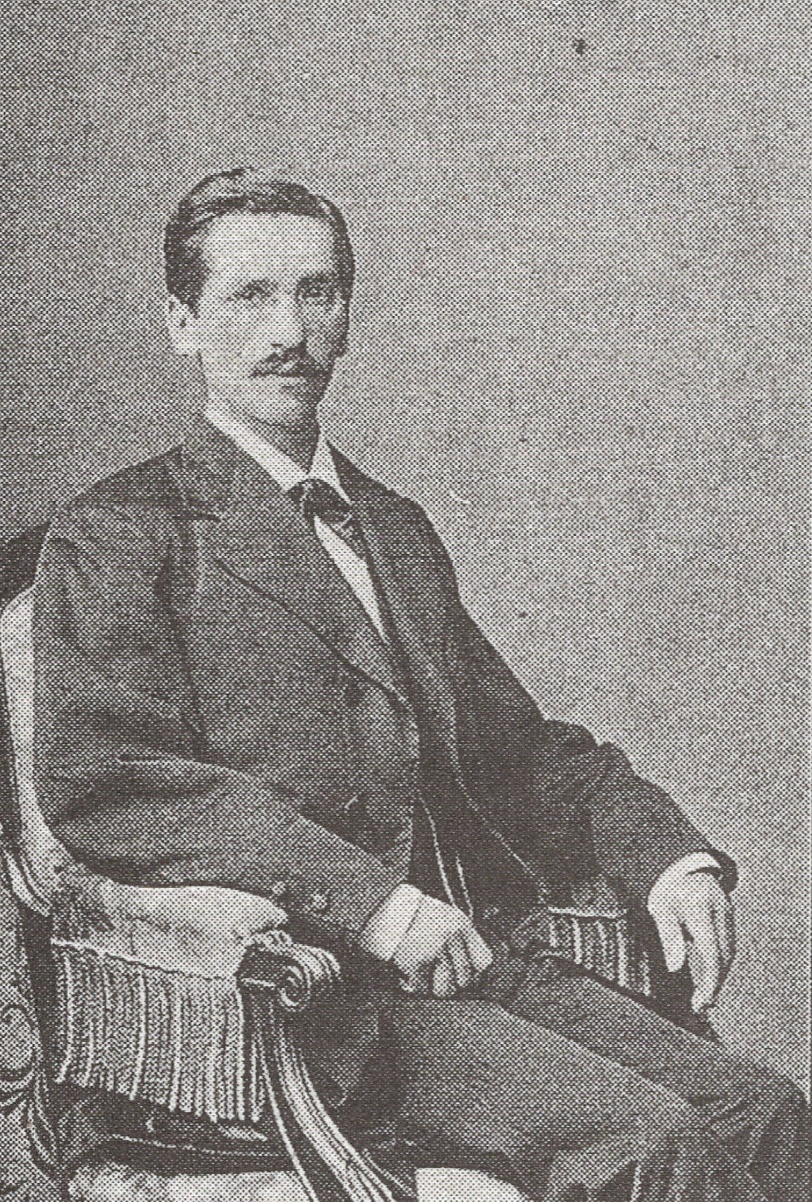
Johann Gustav Hermes

Johann Gustav Hermes (20 June 1846 – 8 June 1912) was a German mathematician. Hermes is known for constructing a polygon with 65,537 sides.

== Early life ==
On 20 June 1846, Hermes was born in Königsberg, a former German city (presently Kaliningrad, Russia). Hermes was educated at the Kneiphöfischen Gymnasium. He undertook his Abitur (final examination) at the school in 1866. After completing his secondary education, he studied mathematics from 1866 to 1870, mostly in Königsberg. His studies were interrupted due to his participation in the Franco-Prussian War between 1870 and 1871.

== Education ==
On 14 December 1872, Hermes completed his studies and earned a degree in mathematics. On 5 April 1879, Hermes received a doctorate degree and his dissertation was on the "Reduction of the problem of cyclotomy on linear equations (for prime numbers of the form 2^{m}+1)" (German: "Zurückführung des Problems der Kreistheilung auf lineare Gleichungen (für Primzahlen von der Form 2^{m}+1)").

== Career ==
After a probationary year at the Chernyakhovsk Realgymnasium in 1873, Hermes worked as a teacher at the Progymnasium of the Royal Orphanage of Königsberg in Prussia (German: Königliches Waisenhaus zu Königsberg in Preußen). Beginning in 1883 he was an Oberlehrer (or upper teacher). In 1893 he became a professor at the Georgianum Gymnasium in Lingen. Finally, on 1 April 1899, he became a professor and director at the Osnabrück Realgymnasium (now named the Ernst-Moritz-Arndt-Gymnasium).

On 31 December 1906 he asked for an early retirement from his position due to illness.

=== Achievements ===
In 1894, Hermes completed his decade-long effort to find and write down a procedure for the construction of the regular 65537-gon exclusively with a compass and a straightedge. His manuscript, with over 200 pages, is today located at the University of Göttingen.

In his maiden speech as the director at the Osnabrück Realgymnasium on 11 April 1899, he praised the concept of duty of the influential philosopher Immanuel Kant, who was also a resident of Königsberg. He finished with the words "Geduld ist die Pforte der Freude." ("Patience is the gate to joy.")

== Personal life ==
Hermes became ill in December 1906, and died on 8 June 1912. He is buried in Osnabrück, Germany.

== See also ==
- 65537-gon
- List of polygons
