= Napkin ring problem =

Problem in geometry

If a hole of height $h$ is drilled straight through the center of a sphere, the volume of the remaining band does not depend on the size of the sphere. For a larger sphere, the band will be thinner but longer.

Animation of a cut napkin ring with constant height

In geometry, the napkin-ring problem involves finding the volume of what remains after a circular hole is drilled through a sphere. Specifically, the hole has the shape of a right circular cylinder (with two spherical caps) whose axis goes through the center of the sphere. Removing the "hole" leaves a circular "band". It is a counterintuitive fact that this volume does not depend on the original sphere's radius but only on the resulting band's height.

The problem is so called because the part that remains resembles the shape of a napkin ring.

== Statement ==
Suppose that the axis of a right circular cylinder passes through the center of a sphere of radius $R$ and that $h$ represents the height (defined as the distance in a direction parallel to the axis) of the part of the cylinder that is inside the sphere. The "band" is the part of the sphere that is outside the cylinder. The volume of the band depends on $h$ but not on $R$:
$$V=\frac{\pi h^3}{6}.$$

As the radius $R$ of the sphere shrinks, the diameter of the cylinder must also shrink in order that $h$ can remain the same. The band gets thicker, and this would increase its volume. But it also gets shorter in circumference, and this would decrease its volume. The two effects exactly cancel each other out. In the extreme case of the smallest possible sphere, the cylinder vanishes (its radius becomes zero) and the height $h$ equals the diameter of the sphere. In this case the volume of the band is the volume of the whole sphere, which matches the formula given above.

An early study of this problem was written by 17th-century Japanese mathematician Seki Kōwa. According to Smith & Mikami (1914), Seki called this solid an arc-ring, or in Japanese kokan or kokwan.

== Proof ==
Suppose the radius of the sphere is $R$ and the length of the cylinder (or the tunnel) is $h$.

By the Pythagorean theorem, the radius of the cylinder is

Finding the measurements of the ring that is the horizontal cross-section.

$$\sqrt{R^2 - \left(\frac{h}{2}\right)^2},\qquad\qquad(1)$$
and the radius of the horizontal cross-section of the sphere at height $y$ above the "equator" is
$$\sqrt{R^2 - y^2}.\qquad\qquad(2)$$

The cross-section of the band with the plane at height $y$ is the region inside the larger circle of radius given by (2) and outside the smaller circle of radius given by (1). The cross-section's area is therefore the area of the larger circle minus the area of the smaller circle:
$$\begin{align}
& {}\quad \pi(\text{larger radius})^2 - \pi(\text{smaller radius})^2 \\
& = \pi\left(\sqrt{R^2 - y^2}\right)^2 - \pi\left(\sqrt{R^2 - \left(\frac{h}{2}\right)^2\,{}}\,\right)^2 = \pi\left(\left(\frac{h}{2}\right)^2 - y^2\right).
\end{align}$$

The radius R does not appear in the last quantity. Therefore, the area of the horizontal cross-section at height $y$ does not depend on $R$, as long as $y\le\tfrac{h}{2}\le R$. The volume of the band is

$$\int_{-h/2}^{h/2} (\text{area of cross-section at height }y) \, dy,$$

and that does not depend on $R$.

This is an application of Cavalieri's principle: volumes with equal-sized corresponding cross-sections are equal. Indeed, the area of the cross-section is the same as that of the corresponding cross-section of a sphere of radius $h/2$, which has volume
$$\frac{4}{3}\pi\left(\frac{h}{2}\right)^3 = \frac{\pi h^3}{6}.$$

== Another Derivation ==
We can also find the napkin ring's volume $V_n$ using previous results. Specifically, volume $V_n$ must equal the original sphere's volume $4\pi R^3/3$ minus the cylinder's volume minus the volume of two spherical caps

$$V_n (R, h, r_c, h_s) = \left \{ \frac{4}{3} \pi R^3 \right \} - \left \{ \pi (r_c)^2 \, h \right \} - 2 \left \{ \frac{\pi}{3} (h_s)^2 (3R - h_s) \right \}$$

In the above, the cylinder volume uses its radius $r_c$ which can be written in terms of $R$ and $h$ as shown in (1)

$$r_c = \sqrt{R^2 - \left(\frac{h}{2}\right)^2}$$

The spherical cap volume used in $V_n$ uses the cap's height $h_s$. This is found by knowing the height of the sphere $2R$ also equals the cylinder's height $h$ plus two spherical cap heights

$$2R = h + 2 h_s \qquad \implies \qquad h_s = R - \frac{h}{2}$$

Substituting $r_c$ and $h_s$ into the expression above for $V_n$ one finds all terms containing $R$ cancel and one gets

$$V_n = \frac{\pi}{6} h^3$$

== See also ==
- Visual calculus, an intuitive way to solve this type of problem, originally applied to finding the area of an annulus, given only its chord length
- String girdling Earth, another problem where the radius of a sphere or circle is counter-intuitively irrelevant
