= Robert Dixon (mathematician) =

British mathematician and graphic artist

Robert Dixon (born 1947) is a British mathematician and graphic artist, known primarily for his book Mathographics and for his plagiarism dispute with Damien Hirst. Dixon was a research associate at the Royal College of Art.

He complained in 2004 that a circular pattern Hirst produced for a children's colouring book was a copy of one of his works. In 2006, Dixon said that Hirst's print Valium had "unmistakable similarities" to one of his own designs. Hirst's manager contested this by explaining the origin of Hirst's piece was from a book The Penguin Dictionary of Curious and Interesting Geometry (1991)—not realising this was one place where Dixon's design had been published.
