= Winding number =

Number of times a curve wraps around a point in the plane

This curve has winding number two around the point p.

In mathematics, the winding number or winding index of a closed curve in the plane around a given point is an integer representing the total number of times that the curve travels counterclockwise around the point, i.e., the curve's number of turns. The winding number depends on the orientation of the curve, and it is negative if the curve travels around the point clockwise.

Winding numbers are fundamental objects of study in algebraic topology, and they play an important role in vector calculus, complex analysis, geometric topology, differential geometry, and physics (such as in string theory).

== Intuitive description ==
An object traveling along the red curve makes two counterclockwise turns around the person at the origin.

Suppose we are given a closed, oriented curve in the xy plane. We can imagine the curve as the path of motion of some object, with the orientation indicating the direction in which the object moves. Then the winding number of the curve is equal to the total number of counterclockwise turns that the object makes around the origin.

When counting the total number of turns, counterclockwise motion counts as positive, while clockwise motion counts as negative. For example, if the object first circles the origin four times counterclockwise, and then circles the origin once clockwise, then the total winding number of the curve is three.

Using this scheme, a curve that does not travel around the origin at all has winding number zero, while a curve that travels clockwise around the origin has negative winding number. Therefore, the winding number of a curve may be any integer. The following pictures show curves with winding numbers between −2 and 3:

| $\cdots$ |
| | −2 | −1 | 0 |
| | | | | $\cdots$ |
| | 1 | 2 | 3 |

== Formal definition ==
Let $\gamma:[0,1] \to \Complex \setminus \{a\}$ be a continuous closed path on the complex plane minus one point. The winding number of $\gamma$ around $a$ is the integer

$$\text{wind}(\gamma,a) = s(1) - s(0),$$

where $(\rho,s)$ is the path written in polar coordinates, i.e. the lifted path through the covering map

$$p:\Reals_{>0} \times \Reals \to \Complex \setminus \{a\}: (\rho_0,s_0) \mapsto a+\rho_0 e^{i2\pi s_0}.$$

The winding number is well defined because of the existence and uniqueness of the lifted path (given the starting point in the covering space) and because all the fibers of $p$ are of the form $\rho_0 \times (s_0 + \Z)$ (so the above expression does not depend on the choice of the starting point). It is an integer because the path is closed.

== Alternative definitions ==
Winding number is often defined in different ways in various parts of mathematics. All of the definitions below are equivalent to the one given above:

=== Alexander numbering ===
A simple combinatorial rule for defining the winding number was proposed by August Ferdinand Möbius in 1865 and again independently by James Waddell Alexander II in 1928. Any curve partitions the plane into several connected regions, one of which is unbounded. The winding numbers of the curve around two points in the same region are equal. The winding number around (any point in) the unbounded region is zero. Finally, the winding numbers for any two adjacent regions differ by exactly 1; the region with the larger winding number appears on the left side of the curve (with respect to motion down the curve).

=== Complex analysis ===
Winding numbers play a very important role throughout complex analysis (cf. the statement of the residue theorem). In the context of complex analysis, the winding number of a closed curve $\gamma$ in the complex plane can be expressed in terms of the complex coordinate z = x + iy. Specifically, if we write z = re^{iθ}, then

$$dz = e^{i\theta} dr + ire^{i\theta} d\theta$$

and therefore

$$\frac{dz}{z} = \frac{dr}{r} + i\,d\theta = d[ \ln r ] + i\,d\theta.$$

As $\gamma$ is a closed curve, the total change in $\ln (r)$ is zero, and thus the integral of $\frac{dz}{z}$ is equal to $i$ multiplied by the total change in $\theta$. Therefore, the winding number of closed path $\gamma$ about the origin is given by the expression

$$\frac{1}{2\pi i} \oint_\gamma \frac{dz}{z} \, .$$

More generally, if $\gamma$ is a closed curve parameterized by $t\in[\alpha,\beta]$, the winding number of $\gamma$ about $z_0$, also known as the index of $z_0$ with respect to $\gamma$, is defined for complex $z_0\notin \gamma([\alpha, \beta])$ as

$$\mathrm{Ind}_\gamma(z_0) = \frac{1}{2\pi i} \oint_\gamma \frac{d\zeta}{\zeta - z_0} = \frac{1}{2\pi i} \int_{\alpha}^{\beta} \frac{\gamma'(t)}{\gamma(t) - z_0} dt.$$

This is a special case of the famous Cauchy integral formula.

Some of the basic properties of the winding number in the complex plane are given by the following theorem:

Theorem. Let $\gamma:[\alpha,\beta]\to\mathbb{C}$ be a closed path and let $\Omega$ be the set complement of the image of $\gamma$, that is, $\Omega:=\mathbb{C}\setminus\gamma([\alpha,\beta])$. Then the index of $z$ with respect to $\gamma$,
$$\mathrm{Ind}_\gamma:\Omega\to \mathbb{C},\ \ z\mapsto \frac{1}{2\pi i}\oint_\gamma \frac{d\zeta}{\zeta-z},$$
is (i) integer-valued, i.e., $\mathrm{Ind}_\gamma(z)\in\mathbb{Z}$ for all $z\in\Omega$; (ii) constant over each component (i.e., maximal connected subset) of $\Omega$; and (iii) zero if $z$ is in the unbounded component of $\Omega$.

As an immediate corollary, this theorem gives the winding number of a circular path $\gamma$ about a point $z$. As expected, the winding number counts the number of (counterclockwise) loops $\gamma$ makes around $z$:

Corollary. If $\gamma$ is the path defined by $\gamma(t)=a+re^{int},\ \ 0\leq t\leq 2\pi, \ \ n\in\mathbb{Z}$, then
$$\mathrm{Ind}_\gamma(z) = \begin{cases} n, & |z-a|< r; \\ 0, & |z-a|> r. \end{cases}$$

=== Topology ===
In topology, the winding number is an alternate term for the degree of a continuous mapping. In physics, winding numbers are frequently called topological quantum numbers. In both cases, the same concept applies.

The above example of a curve winding around a point has a simple topological interpretation. The complement of a point in the plane is homotopy equivalent to the circle, such that maps from the circle to itself are really all that need to be considered. It can be shown that each such map can be continuously deformed to (is homotopic to) one of the standard maps $S^1 \to S^1 : s \mapsto s^n$, where multiplication in the circle is defined by identifying it with the complex unit circle. The set of homotopy classes of maps from a circle to a topological space form a group, which is called the first homotopy group or fundamental group of that space. The fundamental group of the circle is the additive group of the integers, Z; and the winding number of a complex curve is just its homotopy class.

Maps from the 3-sphere to itself are also classified by an integer which is also called the winding number or sometimes Pontryagin index.

== Turning number ==
This curve has total curvature 6π, turning number 3, though it only has winding number 2 about p.

One can also consider the winding number of the path with respect to the tangent of the path itself. As a path followed through time, this would be the winding number with respect to the origin of the velocity vector. In this case the example illustrated at the beginning of this article has a winding number of 3, because the small loop is counted.

This is only defined for immersed paths (i.e., for differentiable paths with nowhere vanishing derivatives), and is the degree of the tangential Gauss map.

This is called the turning number, rotation number, rotation index or index of the curve, and can be computed as the total curvature divided by 2π.

=== Polygons ===
In polygons, the turning number is referred to as the polygon density. For convex polygons, and more generally simple polygons (not self-intersecting), the density is 1, by the Jordan curve theorem. By contrast, for a regular star polygon {p/q}, the density is q.

=== Space curves ===
Turning number cannot be defined for space curves as degree requires matching dimensions. However, for locally convex, closed space curves, one can define tangent turning sign as $(-1)^d$, where $d$ is the turning number of the stereographic projection of its tangent indicatrix. Its two values correspond to the two non-degenerate homotopy classes of locally convex curves.

== Winding number and Heisenberg ferromagnet equations ==
The winding number is closely related with the (2 + 1)-dimensional continuous Heisenberg ferromagnet equations and its integrable extensions: the Ishimori equation etc. Solutions of the last equations are classified by the winding number or topological charge (topological invariant and/or topological quantum number).

== Applications ==
Visualization of Dan Sunday's winding number algorithm. A winding number of 0 means the point is outside the polygon; other values indicate the point is inside the polygon

=== Point in polygon ===
A point's winding number with respect to a polygon can be used to solve the point in polygon (PIP) problem – that is, it can be used to determine if the point is inside the polygon or not.

Generally, the ray casting algorithm is a better alternative to the PIP problem as it does not require trigonometric functions, contrary to the winding number algorithm. Nevertheless, the winding number algorithm can be sped up so that it too, does not require calculations involving trigonometric functions. The sped-up version of the algorithm, also known as Sunday's algorithm, is recommended in cases where non-simple polygons should also be accounted for.

== See also ==
- Argument principle
- Coin rotation paradox
- Linking coefficient
- Nonzero-rule
- Polygon density
- Residue theorem
- Schläfli symbol
- Topological degree theory
- Topological quantum number
- Twist (disambiguation)#Mathematics, science, and technology
- Wilson loop
- Writhe
