= 257-gon =

Polygon with 257 sides

Regular 257-gon
- A regular 257-gon
- Type: Regular polygon
- Edges and vertices: 257
- Schläfli symbol: {257}
- Symmetry group: Dihedral (D_{257}), order 2×257
- Internal angle (degrees): 178.599222°
- Properties: Convex, cyclic, equilateral, isogonal, isotoxal
- Dual polygon: Self

In geometry, a 257-gon is a polygon with 257 sides. The sum of the interior angles of any non-self-intersecting 257-gon is 45,900°.

== Regular 257-gon ==
The area of a regular 257-gon is (with t = edge length)

$$A = \frac{257}{4} t^2 \cot \frac{\pi}{257}\approx 5255.751t^2.$$

A whole regular 257-gon is not visually discernible from a circle, and its perimeter differs from that of the circumscribed circle by about 24 parts per million.

=== Construction ===
The regular 257-gon (one with all sides equal and all angles equal) is of interest for being a constructible polygon: that is, it can be constructed using a compass and an unmarked straightedge. This is because 257 is a Fermat prime, being of the form 2^{2^{n}} + 1 (in this case n = 3). Thus, the values $\cos \frac{\pi}{257}$ and $\cos \frac{2\pi}{257}$ are 128-degree algebraic numbers, and like all constructible numbers they can be written using square roots and no higher-order roots.

Although it was known to Gauss by 1801 that the regular 257-gon was constructible, the first explicit constructions of a regular 257-gon were given by Magnus Georg Paucker (1822) and Friedrich Julius Richelot (1832). Another method involves the use of 150 circles, 24 being Carlyle circles: this method is pictured below, along with a full construction showing all steps. One of these Carlyle circles solves the quadratic equation x^{2} + x − 64 = 0.

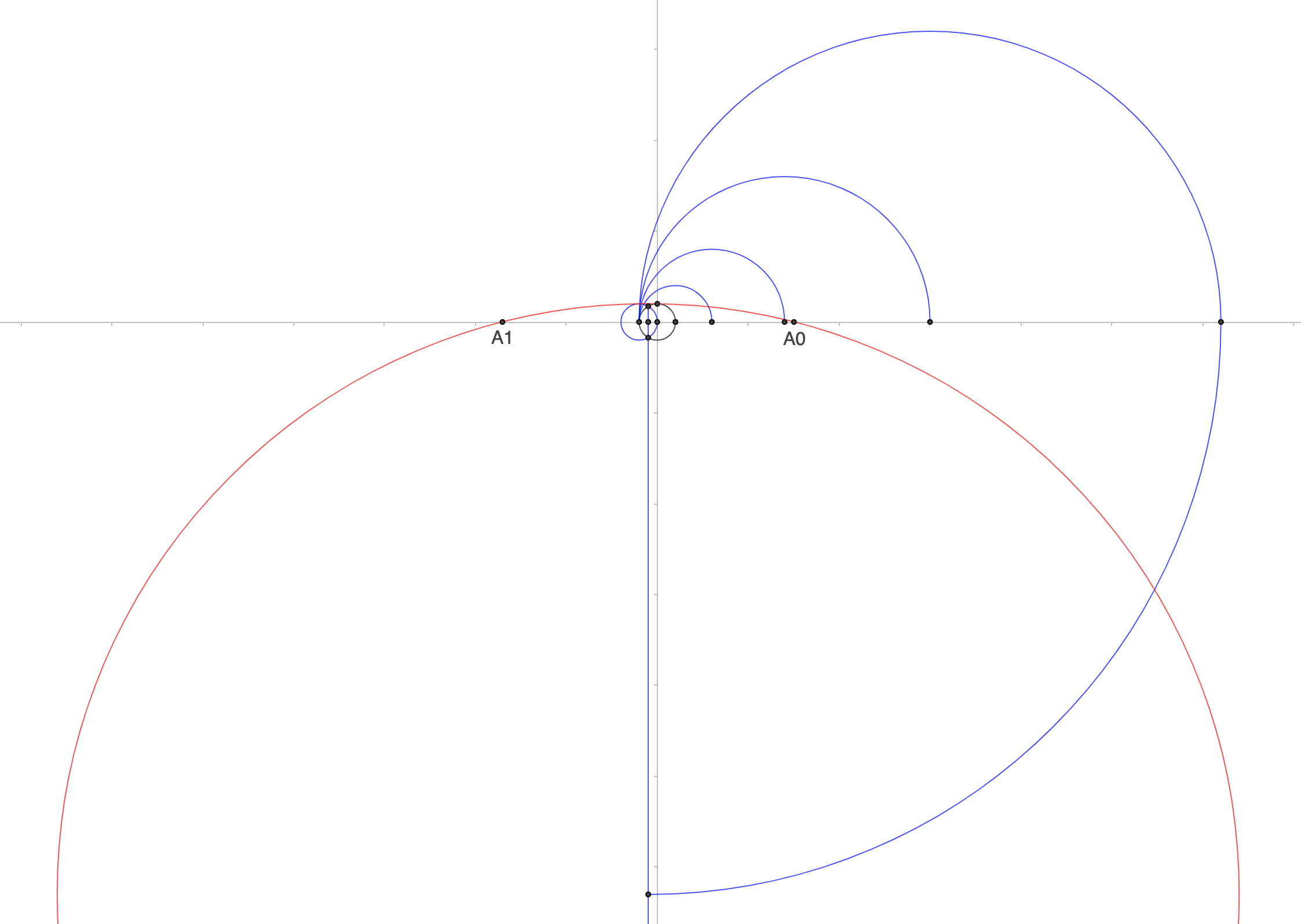
Step 1

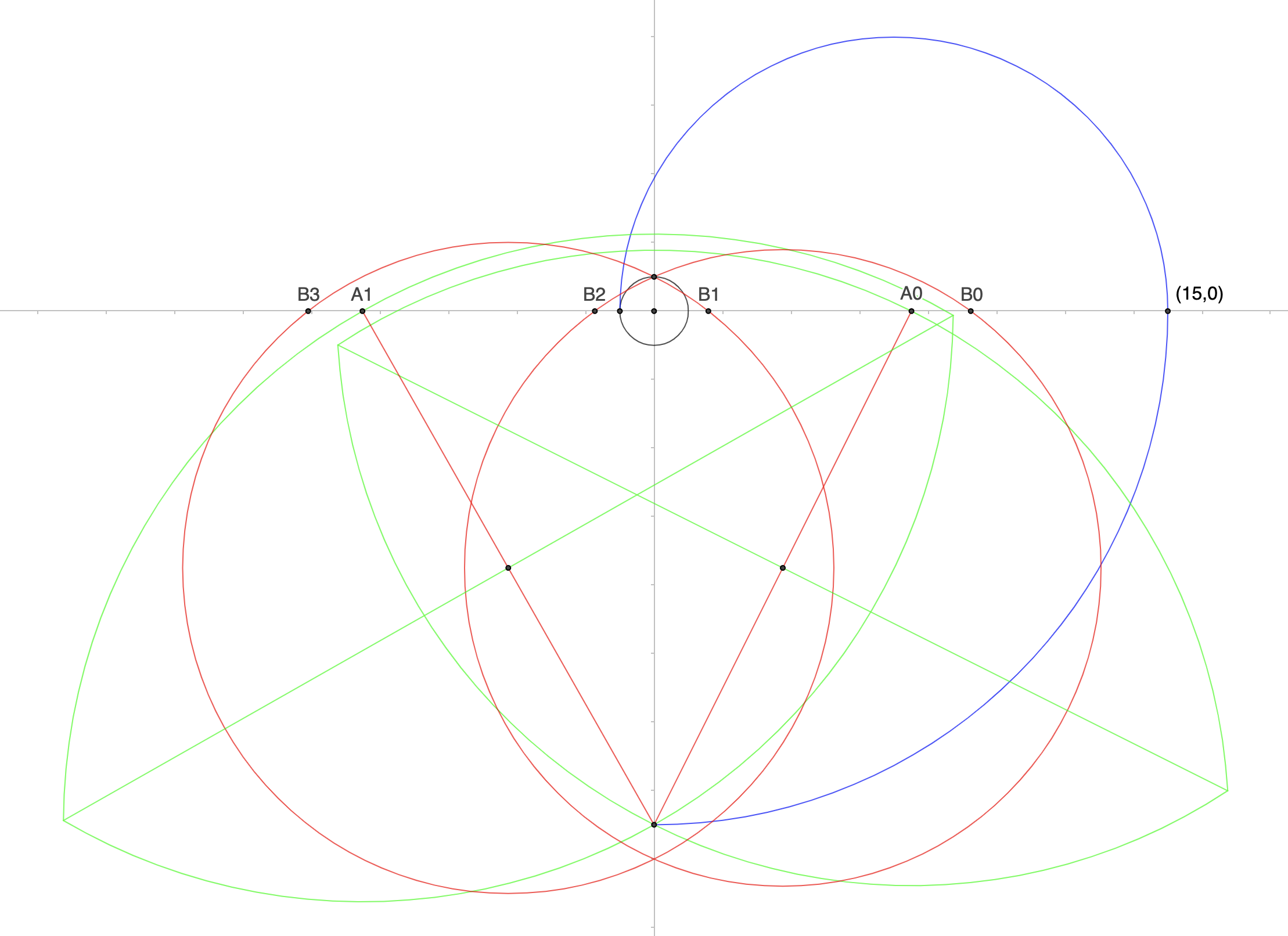
Step 2

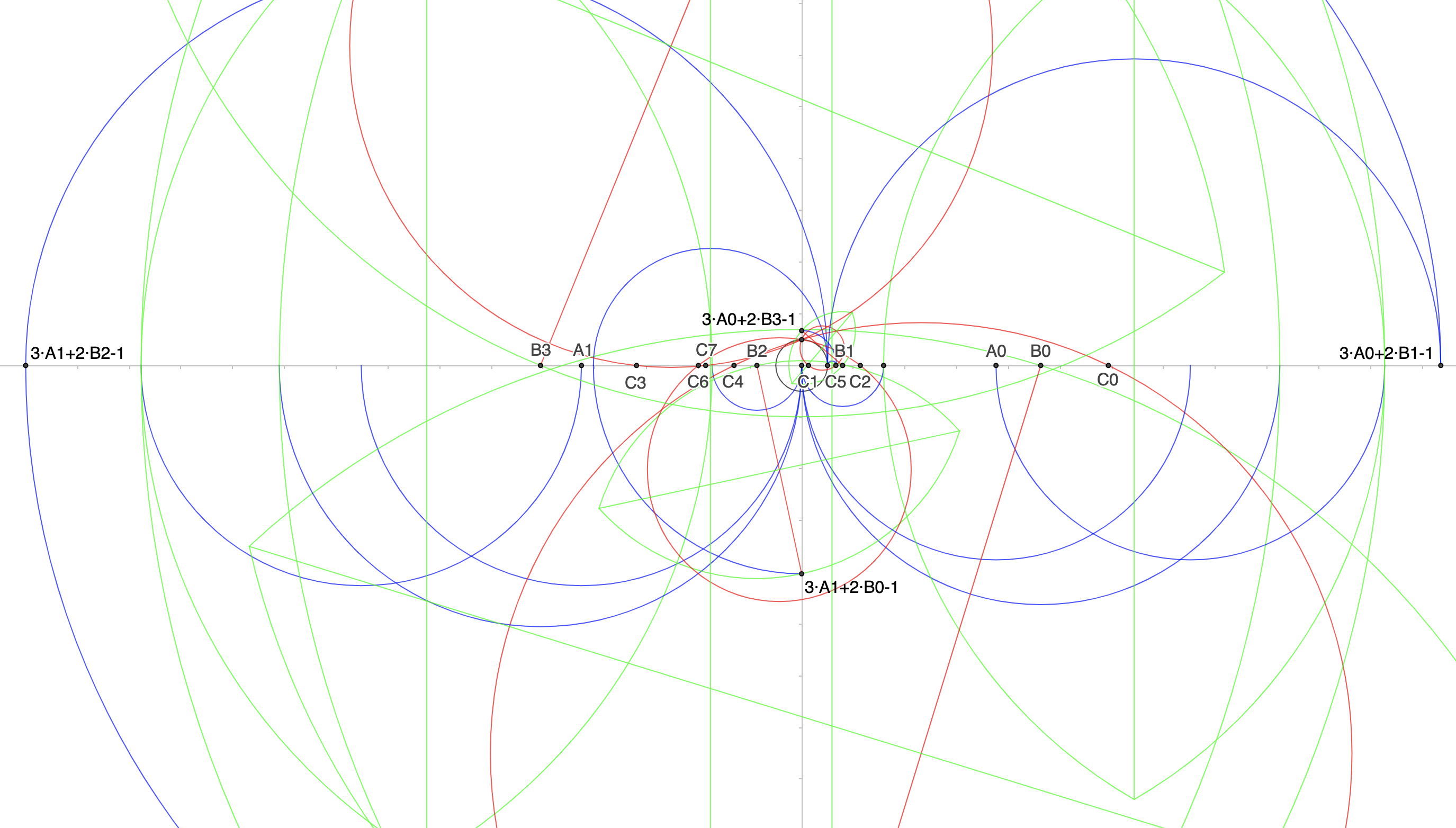
Step 3

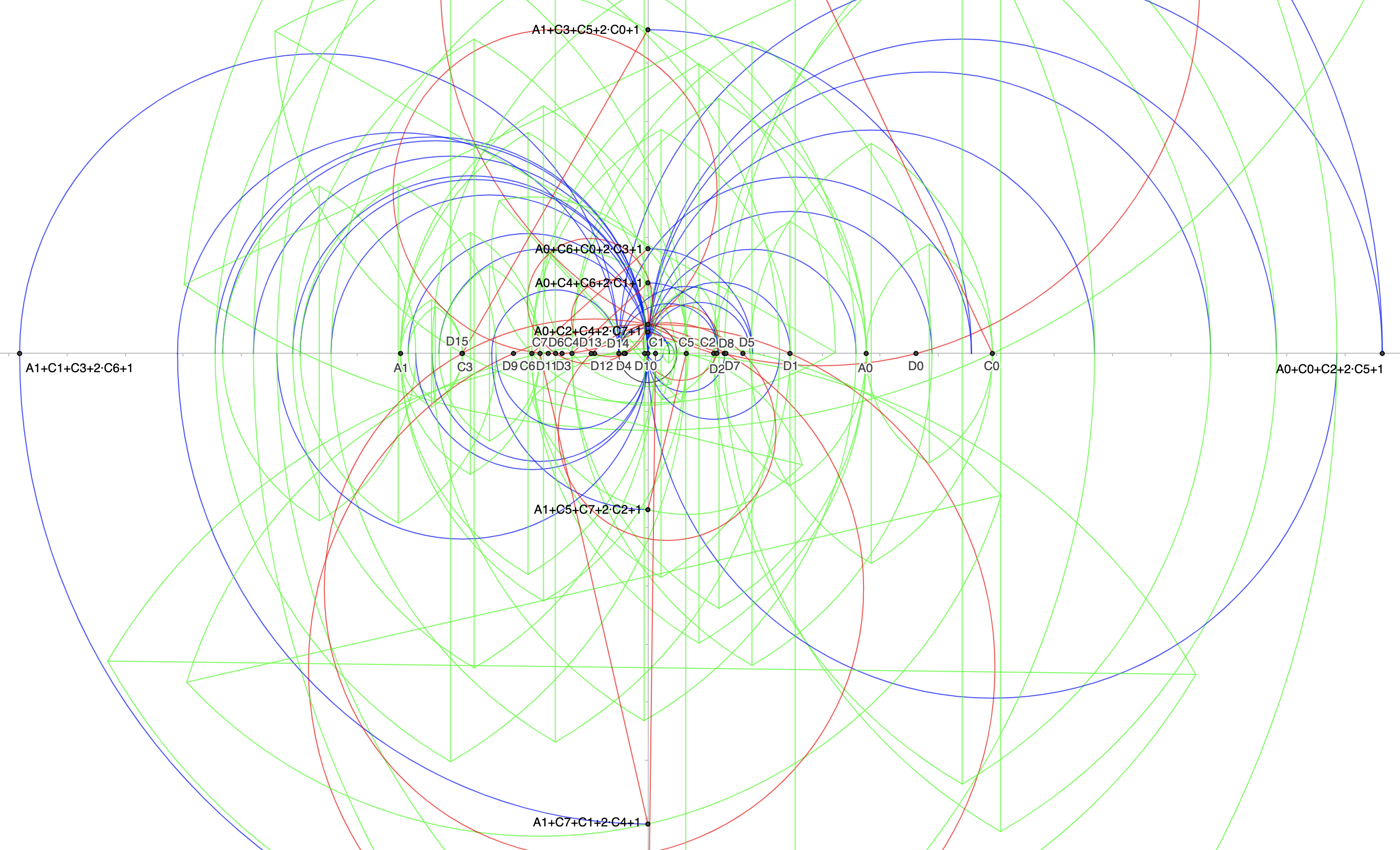
Step 4

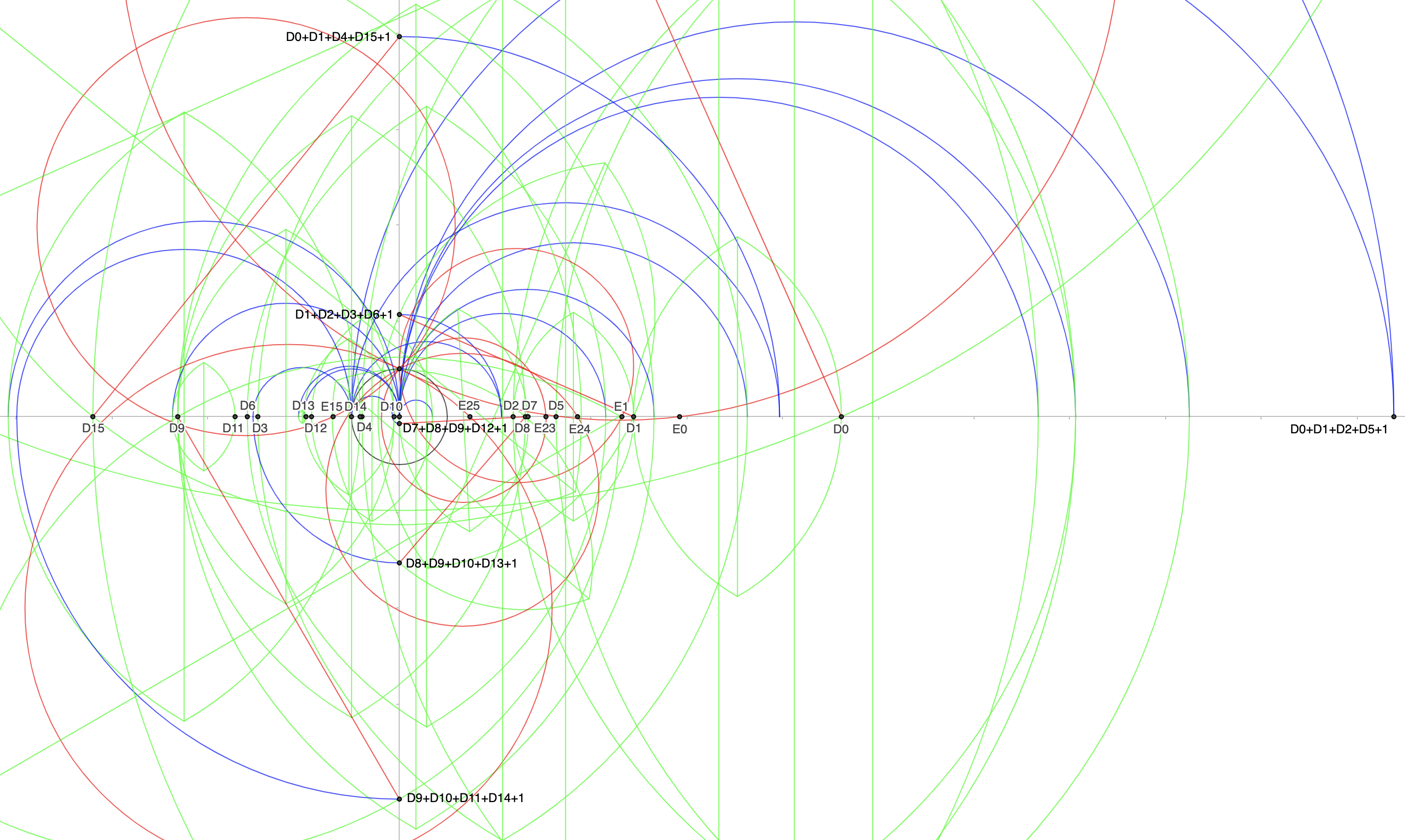
Step 5

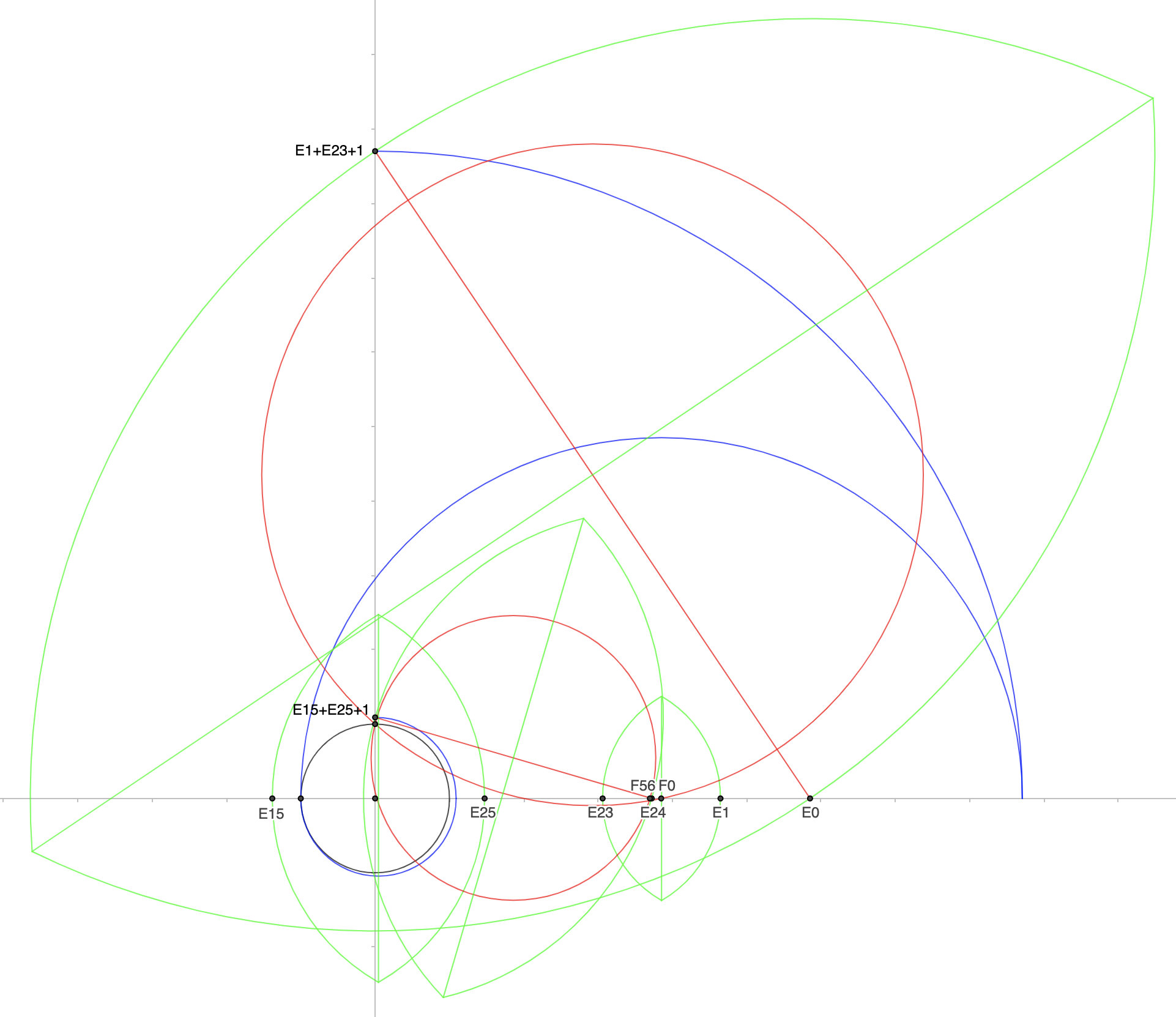
Step 6

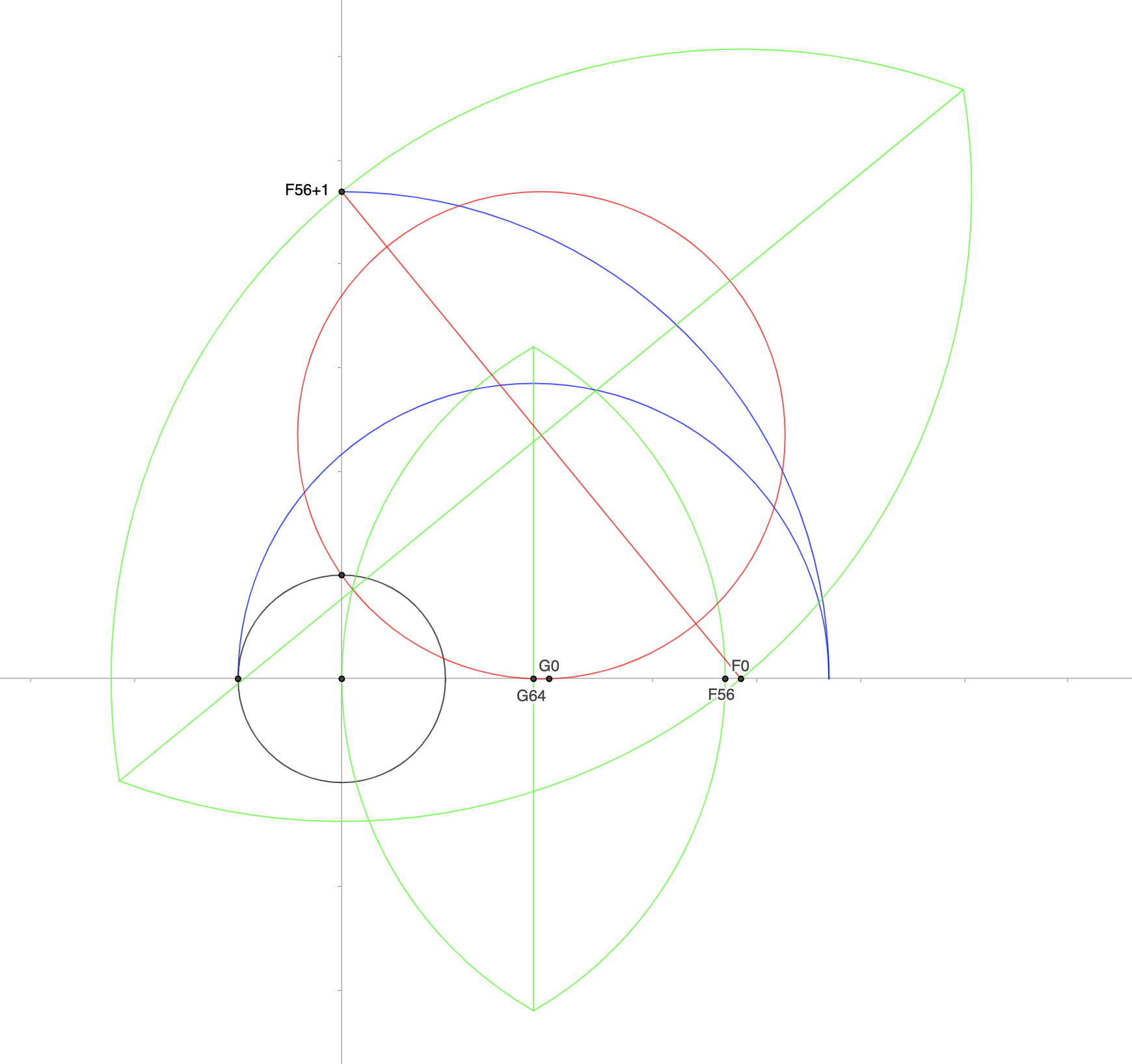
Step 7

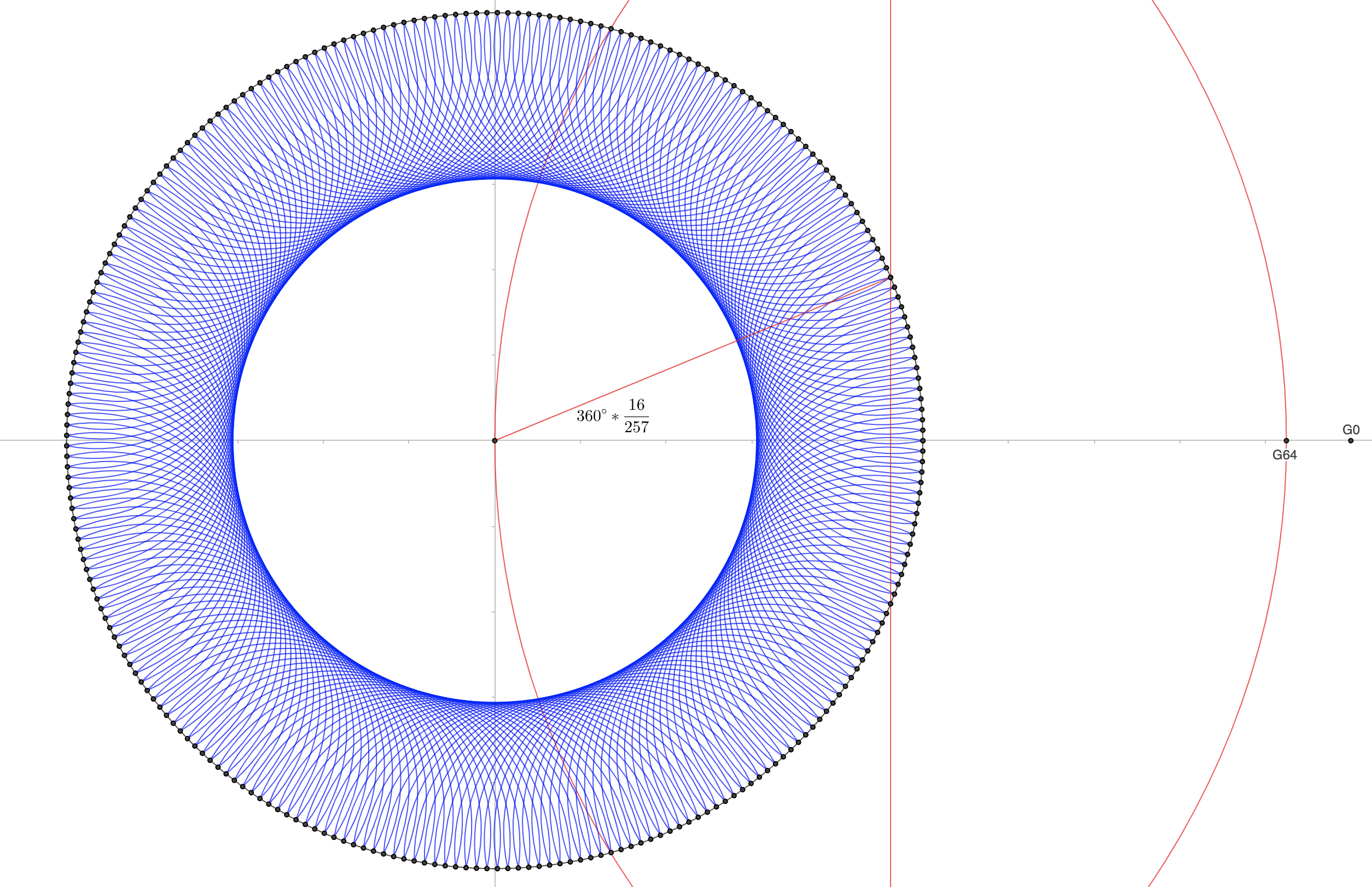
Step 8

=== Symmetry ===
The regular 257-gon has Dih_{257} symmetry, order 514. Since 257 is a prime number there is one subgroup with dihedral symmetry: Dih_{1}, and 2 cyclic group symmetries: Z_{257}, and Z_{1}.

== 257-gram ==
A 257-gram is a 257-sided star polygon. As 257 is prime, there are 127 regular forms generated by Schläfli symbols {257/n} for all integers 2 ≤ n ≤ 128 as $\left\lfloor \frac{257}{2} \right\rfloor = 128$.

Below is a view of {257/128}, with 257 nearly radial edges, with its star vertex internal angles 180°/257 (~0.7°).

== See also ==
- 17-gon
