= Eduard Lill =

Austrian engineer and army officer

Eduard Lill (1830–1900) was an Austrian engineer and army officer.

== Life ==
Lill was born 20 October 1830 in Brüx (Bohemia). From 1848 to 1849 he studied mathematics at the Czech Technical University in Prague and in 1850 he joined the military engineering corps of the Austrian Empire. From 1852 to 1856 he continued his education at the military engineering academy at Klosterbruck near Znaim. Later he was stationed in Esseg, Kronstadt and Spalato until he retired from his military career in 1868 with the rank of captain (Hauptmann) of the engineering corps. In the same year he became an engineer for the Austrian Northwestern Railway and oversaw the railroad construction at Trautenau (Trutnov). A severe accident however restricted him soon to office work. From 1872-1875 he worked as a secretary for the director of construction of the railway company. Later he became a technical consultant for company's headquarters and in 1885 the head of its statistics department. He retired in 1894 with the title of a chief inspector.

== Work ==
Lill is best remembered for a contribution in mathematics, and his traffic and transportation research. In mathematics he devised a graphical procedure to determine the roots of polynomials, which in essence is a representation of Horner's scheme. He published his invention in 1867 in the French journal Nouvelles Annales de Mathématiques, and Charles Hermite provided a description of it for the Comptes rendus of the same year. Later it became known as Lill's method.

Lill's transportation research led to what is now called Lill's law of travel (Reisegesetz von Lill). It was one of the first attempts to model the quantity of travellers, in particular railroad passengers, between two locations. While it has been used in civilian engineering, in particular city planning, through much of 20th century, it is now typically replaced by more complex models.

== Publications ==
- Résolution graphique des équations numériques de tous les degrés à une seule inconnue, et description d'un instrument inventé dans ce but. Nouvelles Annales de mathématiques (2), Vol. 6, 1867, pp. 359–362 (online copy)
- Résolution graphique des équations algébriques qui ont des racines imaginaires. Nouvelles Annales de mathématiques (2), Vol. 7, 1868, pp. 363–367 (online copy)
- with Charles Hermite: Résolution graphique des équations numériques d'un degré quelconque à une inconnue C. R. Acad. Sci., Vol. 65, Paris, 1867, pp. 854–857 (online copy)
- Die Grundgesetze des Personenverkehrs. Zeitschrift für Eisenbahnen und Dampfschiffahrt, 1889
- Das Reisegesetz und seine Anwendungen auf den Eisenbahnverkehr. Spielhagen & Schurich, Wien 1891 (online copy)
