= List of self-intersecting polygons =

Sub-list of the list of polytopes

Self-intersecting polygons, crossed polygons, or self-crossing polygons are polygons some of whose edges cross each other. They contrast with simple polygons, whose edges never cross.

Some types of self-intersecting polygons are:

- the crossed quadrilateral, with four edges
  - the antiparallelogram, a crossed quadrilateral with alternate edges of equal length
    - the crossed rectangle, an antiparallelogram whose edges are two opposite sides and the two diagonals of a rectangle, hence having two edges parallel
- Star polygons
  - pentagram, with five edges
  - hexagram, with six edges
  - heptagram, with seven edges
  - octagram, with eight edges
  - enneagram or nonagram, with nine edges
  - decagram, with ten edges
  - hendecagram, with eleven edges
  - dodecagram, with twelve edges
  - icositetragram, with twenty four edges
  - 257-gram, with two hundred and fifty seven edges

== See also ==
- List of regular polytopes and compounds § Stars
- Complex polygon
