= Heptadecagon =

Polygon with 17 edges

Regular heptadecagon
- A regular heptadecagon
- Type: Regular polygon
- Edges and vertices: 17
- Schläfli symbol: {17}
- Symmetry group: Dihedral (D_{17}), order 2×17
- Internal angle (degrees): ≈158.82°
- Properties: Convex, cyclic, equilateral, isogonal, isotoxal
- Dual polygon: Self

In geometry, a heptadecagon, septadecagon or 17-gon is a seventeen-sided polygon.

== Regular heptadecagon ==
A regular heptadecagon is represented by the Schläfli symbol {17}.

=== Construction ===
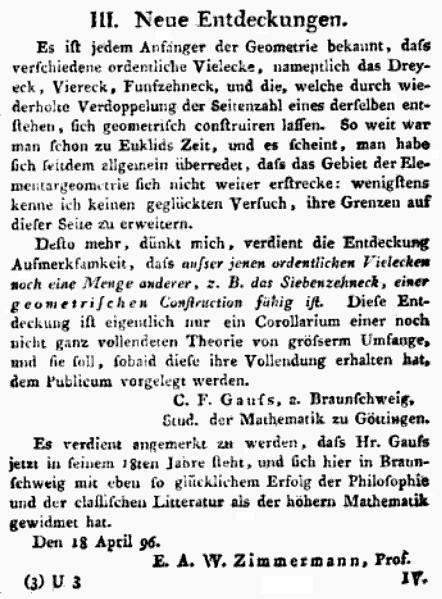
Publication by C. F. Gauss in Intelligenzblatt der allgemeinen Literatur-Zeitung

As 17 is a Fermat prime, the regular heptadecagon is a constructible polygon (that is, one that can be constructed using a straightedge and compass): this was shown by Carl Friedrich Gauss in 1796. This proof represented the first progress in regular polygon construction in over 2,000 years. Gauss's proof relies first on the fact that constructibility is equivalent to expressibility of the trigonometric functions of the common angle in terms of arithmetic operations and square root extractions, and second on his proof that this can be done if the odd prime factors of $N$, the number of sides of the regular polygon, are distinct Fermat primes, which are of the form $F_n = 2^{2^n} + 1$ for some nonnegative integer $n$. Constructing a regular heptadecagon thus involves finding the cosine of $2\pi/17$ in terms of square roots. Gauss's book Disquisitiones Arithmeticae gives this (in modern notation) as
$$\begin{align}\cos\frac{2\pi}{17} = & \frac{1}{16}\left(\sqrt{17}-1+\sqrt{34-2\sqrt{17}}\right)\\
& + \frac{1}{8}\left(\sqrt{17+3\sqrt{17}-
\sqrt{34-2\sqrt{17}}-2\sqrt{34+2\sqrt{17}}} \right).\\
\end{align}$$

Gaussian construction of the regular heptadecagon.

Constructions for the equilateral triangle, pentagon, pentadecagon, and polygons with 2^{h} times as many sides had been given by Euclid, but constructions based on the Fermat primes other than 3 and 5 were unknown to the ancients. (The only known Fermat primes are F_{n} for n = 0, 1, 2, 3, 4. They are 3, 5, 17, 257, and 65537.)

The explicit construction of a heptadecagon was given by Herbert William Richmond in 1893. The following method of construction uses Carlyle circles, as shown below. Based on the construction of the regular 17-gon, one can readily construct n-gons with n being the product of 17 with 3 or 5 (or both) and any power of 2: a regular 51-gon, 85-gon or 255-gon and any regular n-gon with 2^{h} times as many sides.

Construction according to Duane W. DeTemple with Carlyle circles, animation 1 min 57 s

Another construction of the regular heptadecagon using straightedge and compass is the following:

T. P. Stowell of Rochester, N. Y., responded to Query, by W.E. Heal, Wheeling, Indiana in The Analyst in the year 1877:

To construct a regular polygon of seventeen sides in a circle: Draw the radius CO at right-angles to the diameter AB: On OC and OB, take OQ equal to the half, and OD equal to the eighth part of the radius: Make DE and DF each equal to DQ and EG and FH respectively equal to EQ and FQ; take OK a mean proportional between OH and OQ, and through K, draw KM parallel to AB, meeting the semicircle described on OG in M; draw MN parallel to OC, cutting the given circle in N – the arc AN is the seventeenth part of the whole circumference.

Construction according to "sent by T. P. Stowell, credited to Leybourn's Math. Repository, 1818". Added: "take OK a mean proportional between OH and OQ"

Construction according to "sent by T. P. Stowell, credited to Leybourn's Math. Repository, 1818". Added: "take OK a mean proportional between OH and OQ", animation

The following simple design comes from Richmond in 1893:

LET OA, OB (fig. 6) be two perpendicular radii of a circle. Make OI one-fourth of OB, and the angle OIE one-fourth of OIA; also find in OA produced a point F such that EIF is 45°. Let the circle on AF as diameter cut OB in K, and let the circle whose centre is E and radius EK cut OA in N_{3} and N_{5}; then if ordinates N_{3}P_{3}, N_{5}P_{5} are drawn to the circle, the arcs AP_{3}, AP_{5} will be 3/17 and 5/17 of the circumference.

- The point N_{3} is very close to the center point of Thales' theorem over AF.

Construction according to H. W. Richmond

Construction according to H. W. Richmond as animation

The following construction is a variant of Richmond's construction.

The differences from the original:

- The circle k_{2} determines the point H instead of the bisector w_{3}.
- The circle k_{4} around the point G' (reflection of the point G at m) yields the point N, which is no longer so close to M, for the construction of the tangent.
- Some names have been changed.

Heptadecagon in principle according to H.W. Richmond, a variation of the design regarding to point N

Another more recent construction is given by Callagy.

=== Trigonometric derivation using nested quadratic equations ===
Combine nested double-angle formula with supplementary-angle formula to get the nested quadratic polynomial below.

$\cos\frac{2m\pi}{17} = 2\cos^2\frac{m\pi}{17} - 1$, AND
$$\cos\frac{16\pi}{17} = \cos({\pi - \frac{\pi}{17}}) = - \cos\frac{\pi}{17} = -X$$

Therefore,

$$-X = - \cos\frac{\pi}{17} = \cos\frac{16\pi}{17} = 2 \cos^2\frac{8\pi}{17} - 1 = 2 \times {(2 \cos^2\frac{4\pi}{17} - 1)}^2 - 1$$
$$\cos\frac{4\pi}{17} = 2 \cos^2\frac{2\pi}{17} - 1 = 2 \times {(2 \cos^2\frac{\pi}{17} - 1)}^2 - 1 = 2 (2 X^2-1)^2 - 1$$

On simplifying and solving for X,

$$32768 X^{16} - 131072 X^{14} + 212992 X^{12} - 180224 X^{10} + 84480 X^8 - 21504 X^6 + 2688 X^4 - 128 X^2 + 1 = -X$$
$$\cos\frac{\pi}{17} = X = \frac{\sqrt{34-\sqrt{68}}-\sqrt{17}+1 + 2\sqrt{\sqrt{34-\sqrt{68}}+\sqrt{17}-1} \sqrt{\sqrt{17+\sqrt{272}}}}{16}$$

=== Exact value of sin and cos of mπ/((17 × 2^{n})) ===
If $A = \sqrt{2(17\pm\sqrt{17})}$, $B = (\sqrt{17}\pm1)$ and $C = 17\mp4\sqrt{17}$ then, depending on any integer m

$$\cos\frac{m\pi}{17} = \pm\frac{(A \pm B) \pm 2\sqrt{(A \mp B)\sqrt{C}}}{16}$$
$$= \pm\frac{\sqrt{34\pm\sqrt{68}}\pm(\sqrt{17}\pm1) \pm 2\sqrt{\sqrt{34\pm\sqrt{68}} \mp(\sqrt{17}\pm1)} \sqrt{\sqrt{17\mp\sqrt{272}}}}{16}$$

For example, if m = 1

$$\cos\frac{\pi}{17} = \frac{\sqrt{34-\sqrt{68}}-\sqrt{17}+1 + 2\sqrt{\sqrt{34-\sqrt{68}}+\sqrt{17}-1} \sqrt{\sqrt{17+\sqrt{272}}}}{16}$$

Here are the expressions simplified into the following table.

Cos and Sin (m π / 17) in first quadrant, from which other quadrants are computable.
m	16 cos (m π / 17)	8 sin (m π / 17)
1	$+1-\sqrt{17}+\sqrt{34-\sqrt{68}} + \sqrt{68+\sqrt{2448}+\sqrt{2720+\sqrt{6284288}}}$	$\sqrt{34 - \sqrt{68} - \sqrt{136-\sqrt{1088}} - \sqrt{272+\sqrt{39168}-\sqrt{43520+\sqrt{1608777728}}}}$
2	$-1+\sqrt{17}+\sqrt{34-\sqrt{68}} + \sqrt{68+\sqrt{2448}-\sqrt{2720+\sqrt{6284288}}}$	$\sqrt{34 - \sqrt{68} + \sqrt{136-\sqrt{1088}} - \sqrt{272+\sqrt{39168}+\sqrt{43520+\sqrt{1608777728}}}}$
3	$+1+\sqrt{17}+\sqrt{34+\sqrt{68}} + \sqrt{68-\sqrt{2448}-\sqrt{2720-\sqrt{6284288}}}$	$\sqrt{34 + \sqrt{68} - \sqrt{136+\sqrt{1088}} - \sqrt{272-\sqrt{39168}+\sqrt{43520-\sqrt{1608777728}}}}$
4	$-1+\sqrt{17}-\sqrt{34-\sqrt{68}} + \sqrt{68+\sqrt{2448}+\sqrt{2720+\sqrt{6284288}}}$	$\sqrt{34 - \sqrt{68} - \sqrt{136-\sqrt{1088}} + \sqrt{272+\sqrt{39168}-\sqrt{43520+\sqrt{1608777728}}}}$
5	$+1+\sqrt{17}+\sqrt{34+\sqrt{68}} - \sqrt{68-\sqrt{2448}-\sqrt{2720-\sqrt{6284288}}}$	$\sqrt{34 + \sqrt{68} - \sqrt{136+\sqrt{1088}} + \sqrt{272-\sqrt{39168}+\sqrt{43520-\sqrt{1608777728}}}}$
6	$-1-\sqrt{17}+\sqrt{34+\sqrt{68}} + \sqrt{68-\sqrt{2448}+\sqrt{2720-\sqrt{6284288}}}$	$\sqrt{34 + \sqrt{68} + \sqrt{136+\sqrt{1088}} - \sqrt{272-\sqrt{39168}-\sqrt{43520-\sqrt{1608777728}}}}$
7	$+1+\sqrt{17}-\sqrt{34+\sqrt{68}} + \sqrt{68-\sqrt{2448}+\sqrt{2720-\sqrt{6284288}}}$	$\sqrt{34 + \sqrt{68} + \sqrt{136+\sqrt{1088}} + \sqrt{272-\sqrt{39168}-\sqrt{43520-\sqrt{1608777728}}}}$
8	$-1+\sqrt{17}+\sqrt{34-\sqrt{68}} - \sqrt{68+\sqrt{2448}-\sqrt{2720+\sqrt{6284288}}}$	$\sqrt{34 - \sqrt{68} + \sqrt{136-\sqrt{1088}} + \sqrt{272+\sqrt{39168}+\sqrt{43520+\sqrt{1608777728}}}}$

Therefore, applying induction with m=1 and starting with n=0:

$$\cos\frac{\pi}{17 \times 2^0} = \frac{1-\sqrt{17}+\sqrt{34-\sqrt{68}} + \sqrt{68+\sqrt{2448}+\sqrt{2720+\sqrt{6284288}}}}{16}$$
$\cos\frac{\pi}{17 \times 2^{n+1}} = \frac{\sqrt{2 + 2\cos\frac{\pi}{17 \times 2^n}}}{2}$ and $\sin\frac{\pi}{17 \times 2^{n+1}} = \frac{\sqrt{2 - 2\cos\frac{\pi}{17 \times 2^n}}}{2}.$

== Symmetry ==
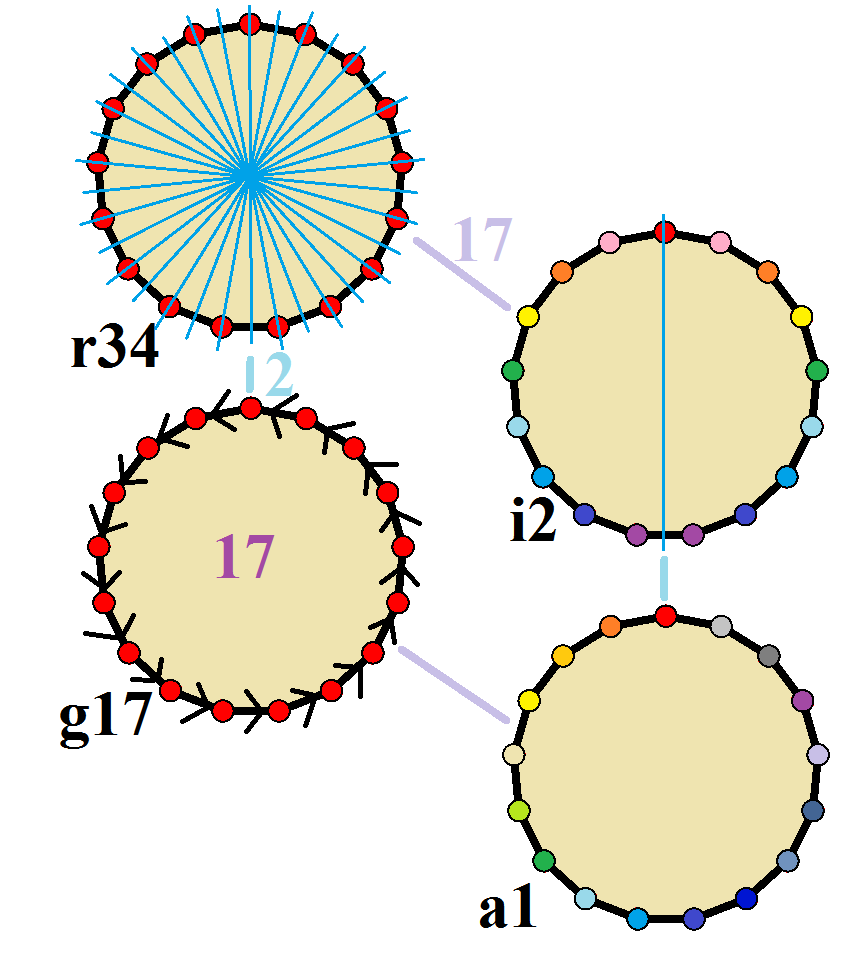
Symmetries of a regular heptadecagon. Vertices are colored by their symmetry positions. Blue mirror lines are drawn through vertices and edges. Gyration orders are given in the center.

The regular heptadecagon has Dih_{17} symmetry, order 34. Since 17 is a prime number there is one subgroup with dihedral symmetry: Dih_{1}, and 2 cyclic group symmetries: Z_{17}, and Z_{1}.

These 4 symmetries can be seen in 4 distinct symmetries on the heptadecagon. John Conway labels these by a letter and group order. Full symmetry of the regular form is r34 and no symmetry is labeled a1. The dihedral symmetries are divided depending on whether they pass through vertices (d for diagonal) or edges (p for perpendiculars), and i when reflection lines path through both edges and vertices. Cyclic symmetries in the middle column are labeled as g for their central gyration orders.

Each subgroup symmetry allows one or more degrees of freedom for irregular forms. Only the g17 subgroup has no degrees of freedom but can be seen as directed edges.

== Related polygons ==
=== Heptadecagrams ===
A heptadecagram is a 17-sided star polygon. There are seven regular forms given by Schläfli symbols: {17/2}, {17/3}, {17/4}, {17/5}, {17/6}, {17/7}, and {17/8}. Since 17 is a prime number, all of these are regular stars and not compound figures.

Picture	{17/2}	{17/3}	{17/4}	{17/5}	{17/6}	{17/7}	{17/8}
Interior angle	≈137.647°	≈116.471°	≈95.2941°	≈74.1176°	≈52.9412°	≈31.7647°	≈10.5882°

=== Petrie polygons ===
The regular heptadecagon is the Petrie polygon for one higher-dimensional regular convex polytope, projected in a skew orthogonal projection:

16-simplex (16D)
