= Complex polygon =

Polygon in complex space, or which self-intersects

The term complex polygon can mean two different things:

- In geometry, a polygon in the unitary plane, which has two complex dimensions.
- In computer graphics, a polygon whose boundary is not simple.

== Geometry ==
In geometry, a complex polygon is a polygon in the complex Hilbert plane, which has two complex dimensions.

A complex number may be represented in the form $(a + ib)$, where $a$ and $b$ are real numbers, and $i$ is the square root of $-1$. Multiples of $i$ such as $ib$ are called imaginary numbers. A complex number lies in a complex plane having one real and one imaginary dimension, which may be represented as an Argand diagram. So a single complex dimension comprises two spatial dimensions, but of different kinds - one real and the other imaginary.

The unitary plane comprises two such complex planes, which are orthogonal to each other. Thus it has two real dimensions and two imaginary dimensions.

A complex polygon is a (complex) two-dimensional (i.e. four spatial dimensions) analogue of a real polygon. As such it is an example of the more general complex polytope in any number of complex dimensions.

In a real plane, a visible figure can be constructed as the real conjugate of some complex polygon.

== Computer graphics ==
A complex (self-intersecting) pentagon with vertices indicated

All regular star polygons (with fractional Schläfli symbols) are complex

In computer graphics, a complex polygon is a polygon which has a boundary comprising discrete circuits, such as a polygon with a hole in it.

Self-intersecting polygons are also sometimes included among the complex polygons. Vertices are only counted at the ends of edges, not where edges intersect in space.

A formula relating an integral over a bounded region to a closed line integral may still apply when the "inside-out" parts of the region are counted negatively.

Moving around the polygon, the total amount one "turns" at the vertices can be any integer times 360°, e.g. 720° for a pentagram and 0° for an angular "eight".

== See also ==
- Regular polygon
- Convex hull
- Nonzero-rule
- List of self-intersecting polygons
