= Elementary mathematics =

Mathematics taught in primary and secondary school

A collection of geometric shapes. All shapes of a given color are similar to each other. Shapes and basic geometry are important topics in elementary mathematics.

Both groups are equal to 5. Apples are frequently used to explain arithmetic in textbooks for children.

Elementary mathematics, also known as primary or secondary school mathematics, is the study of mathematics topics that are commonly taught at the primary or secondary school levels around the world. It includes a wide range of mathematical concepts and skills, including number sense, algebra, geometry, measurement, and data analysis. These concepts and skills form the foundation for more advanced mathematical study and are essential for success in many fields and everyday life. The study of elementary mathematics is a crucial part of a student's education and lays the foundation for future academic and career success.

== Strands of elementary mathematics ==
=== Number sense and numeration ===
Number sense is an understanding of numbers and operations. In the 'Number Sense and Numeration' strand students develop an understanding of numbers by being taught various ways of representing numbers, as well as the relationships among numbers.

Properties of the natural numbers such as divisibility and the distribution of prime numbers, are studied in basic number theory, another part of elementary mathematics.

Elementary Focus:

- Abacus
- LCM and GCD
- Fractions and Decimals
- Place Value & Face Value
- Addition and Subtraction
- Multiplication and Division
- Counting
- Counting Money
- Factorial
- Combination without repetition
- Combination with repetition
- Permutation without repetition
- Permutation with repetition
- Algebra
- Equation
- Inequality
- Representing and ordering numbers
- Estimating
- Approximating
- Problem Solving

=== Spatial sense ===
'Measurement skills and concepts' or 'Spatial Sense' are directly related to the world in which students live. Many of the concepts that students are taught in this strand are also used in other subjects such as science, social studies, and physical education In the measurement strand students learn about the measurable attributes of objects, in addition to the basic metric system.

Elementary Focus:

- Standard and non-standard units of measurement
- telling time using 12 hour clock and 24 hour clock
- comparing objects using measurable attributes
- measuring height, length, width
- centimetres and metres
- mass and capacity
- temperature change
- days, months, weeks, years
- distances using kilometres
- measuring kilograms and litres
- determining area and perimeter
- determining grams and millilitre
- determining measurements using shapes such as a triangular prism

The measurement strand consists of multiple forms of measurement, as Marian Small states: "Measurement is the process of assigning a qualitative or quantitative description of size to an object based on a particular attribute."

=== Equations and formulas ===
A formula is an entity constructed using the symbols and formation rules of a given logical language. For example, determining the volume of a sphere requires a significant amount of integral calculus or its geometrical analogue, the method of exhaustion; but, having done this once in terms of some parameter (the radius for example), mathematicians have produced a formula to describe the volume.

An equation is a formula of the form A = B, where A and B are expressions that may contain one or several variables called unknowns, and "=" denotes the equality binary relation. Although written in the form of proposition, an equation is not a statement that is either true or false, but a problem consisting of finding the values, called solutions, that, when substituted for the unknowns, yield equal values of the expressions A and B. For example, 2 is the unique solution of the equation x + 2 = 4, in which the unknown is x.

=== Data ===
An example histogram of the heights of 31 Black Cherry trees. Histograms are a common tool used to represent data.

Data is a set of values of qualitative or quantitative variables; restated, pieces of data are individual pieces of information. Data in computing (or data processing) is represented in a structure that is often tabular (represented by rows and columns), a tree (a set of nodes with parent-children relationship), or a graph (a set of connected nodes). Data is typically the result of measurements and can be visualized using graphs or images.

Data as an abstract concept can be viewed as the lowest level of abstraction, from which information and then knowledge are derived.

=== Basic two-dimensional geometry ===
Two-dimensional geometry is a branch of mathematics concerned with questions of shape, size, and relative position of two-dimensional figures. Basic topics in elementary mathematics include polygons, circles, perimeter and areas.

A polygon is a shape that is bounded by a finite chain of straight line segments closing in a loop to form a closed chain or circuit. These segments are called its edges or sides, and the points where two edges meet are the polygon's vertices (singular: vertex) or corners. The interior of the polygon is sometimes called its body. An n-gon is a polygon with n sides. A polygon is a 2-dimensional example of the more general polytope in any number of dimensions.

A circle is a simple shape of two-dimensional geometry that is the set of all points in a plane that are at a given distance from a given point, the center. The distance between any of the points and the center is called the radius. It can also be defined as the locus of a point equidistant from a fixed point.

A perimeter is a path that surrounds a two-dimensional shape. The term may be used either for the path or its length - it can be thought of as the length of the outline of a shape. The perimeter of a circle or ellipse is called its circumference.

Area is the quantity that expresses the extent of a two-dimensional figure or shape. There are several well-known formulas for the areas of simple shapes such as triangles, rectangles, and circles.

=== Proportions ===
Two quantities are proportional if a change in one is always accompanied by a change in the other, and if the changes are always related by use of a constant multiplier. The constant is called the coefficient of proportionality or proportionality constant.

- If one quantity is always the product of the other and a constant, the two are said to be directly proportional. x and y are directly proportional if the ratio $\tfrac yx$ is constant.
- If the product of the two quantities is always equal to a constant, the two are said to be inversely proportional. x and y are inversely proportional if the product $xy$ is constant.

=== Analytic geometry ===
Cartesian coordinates

Analytic geometry is the study of geometry using a coordinate system. This contrasts with synthetic geometry.

Usually the Cartesian coordinate system is applied to manipulate equations for planes, straight lines, and squares, often in two and sometimes in three dimensions. Geometrically, one studies the Euclidean plane (2 dimensions) and Euclidean space (3 dimensions). As taught in school books, analytic geometry can be explained more simply: it is concerned with defining and representing geometrical shapes in a numerical way and extracting numerical information from shapes' numerical definitions and representations.

Transformations are ways of shifting and scaling functions using different algebraic formulas.

=== Negative numbers ===
A negative number is a real number that is less than zero. Such numbers are often used to represent the amount of a loss or absence. For example, a debt that is owed may be thought of as a negative asset, or a decrease in some quantity may be thought of as a negative increase. Negative numbers are used to describe values on a scale that goes below zero, such as the Celsius and Fahrenheit scales for temperature.

=== Exponents and radicals ===
Exponentiation is a mathematical operation, written as b^{n}, involving two numbers, the base b and the exponent (or power) n. When n is a natural number (i.e., a positive integer), exponentiation corresponds to repeated multiplication of the base: that is, b^{n} is the product of multiplying n bases:

$$b^n = \underbrace{b \times \cdots \times b}_n$$

Roots are the opposite of exponents. The nth root of a number x (written $\sqrt[n]{x}$) is a number r which when raised to the power n yields x. That is,

$$\sqrt[n]{x} = r \iff r^n  =  x,$$

where n is the degree of the root. A root of degree 2 is called a square root and a root of degree 3, a cube root. Roots of higher degree are referred to by using ordinal numbers, as in fourth root, twentieth root, etc.

For example:

- 2 is a square root of 4, since 2^{2} = 4.
- −2 is also a square root of 4, since (−2)^{2} = 4.

=== Compass-and-straightedge ===
Compass-and-straightedge, also known as ruler-and-compass construction, is the construction of lengths, angles, and other geometric figures using only an idealized ruler and compass.

The idealized ruler, known as a straightedge, is assumed to be infinite in length, and has no markings on it and only one edge. The compass is assumed to collapse when lifted from the page, so may not be directly used to transfer distances. (This is an unimportant restriction since, using a multi-step procedure, a distance can be transferred even with a collapsing compass, see compass equivalence theorem.) More formally, the only permissible constructions are those granted by the first three postulates of Euclid.

=== Congruence and similarity ===
Two figures or objects are congruent if they have the same shape and size, or if one has the same shape and size as the mirror image of the other. More formally, two sets of points are called congruent if, and only if, one can be transformed into the other by an isometry, i.e., a combination of rigid motions, namely a translation, a rotation, and a reflection. This means that either object can be repositioned and reflected (but not resized) so as to coincide precisely with the other object. So two distinct plane figures on a piece of paper are congruent if we can cut them out and then match them up completely. Turning the paper over is permitted.

Two geometrical objects are called similar if they both have the same shape, or one has the same shape as the mirror image of the other. More precisely, one can be obtained from the other by uniformly scaling (enlarging or shrinking), possibly with additional translation, rotation and reflection. This means that either object can be rescaled, repositioned, and reflected, so as to coincide precisely with the other object. If two objects are similar, each is congruent to the result of a uniform scaling of the other.

=== Three-dimensional geometry ===
Solid geometry was the traditional name for the geometry of three-dimensional Euclidean space. Stereometry deals with the measurements of volumes of various solid figures (three-dimensional figures) including pyramids, cylinders, cones, truncated cones, spheres, and prisms.

=== Rational numbers ===
Rational number is any number that can be expressed as the quotient or fraction p/q of two integers, with the denominator q not equal to zero. Since q may be equal to 1, every integer is a rational number. The set of all rational numbers is usually denoted by a boldface Q (or blackboard bold $\mathbb{Q}$).

=== Patterns, relations and functions ===
A pattern is a discernible regularity in the world or in a manmade design. As such, the elements of a pattern repeat in a predictable manner. A geometric pattern is a kind of pattern formed of geometric shapes and typically repeating like a wallpaper pattern.

A relation on a set A is a collection of ordered pairs of elements of A. In other words, it is a subset of the Cartesian product A^{2} = A × A. Common relations include divisibility between two numbers and inequalities.

A function is a relation between a set of inputs and a set of permissible outputs with the property that each input is related to exactly one output. An example is the function that relates each real number x to its square x^{2}. The output of a function f corresponding to an input x is denoted by f(x) (read "f of x"). In this example, if the input is −3, then the output is 9, and we may write f(−3) = 9. The input variable(s) are sometimes referred to as the argument(s) of the function.

=== Slopes and trigonometry ===
The slope of a line is a number that describes both the direction and the steepness of the line. Slope is often denoted by the letter m.

Trigonometry is a branch of mathematics that studies relationships involving lengths and angles of triangles. The field emerged during the 3rd century BC from applications of geometry to astronomical studies.

== United States ==
In the United States, there has been considerable concern about the low level of elementary mathematics skills on the part of many students, as compared to students in other developed countries. The No Child Left Behind program was one attempt to address this deficiency, requiring that all American students be tested in elementary mathematics.
