= Equivalence theorem =

Equivalence theorem may refer to:

Economics

- Ricardian equivalence, a principle in economics
- Revenue equivalence, a concept in auction theory

Mathematics and physics

- Compass equivalence theorem, a theorem in straightedge and compass construction
- Equivalence principle, in general relativity
- Lax equivalence theorem, a theorem in the analysis of finite difference methods
- Optical equivalence theorem, a theorem in quantum optics
- Surface equivalence principle, a principle in electromagnetism and antenna theory
