= Lorenzo Mascheroni =

Italian mathematician (1750–1800)

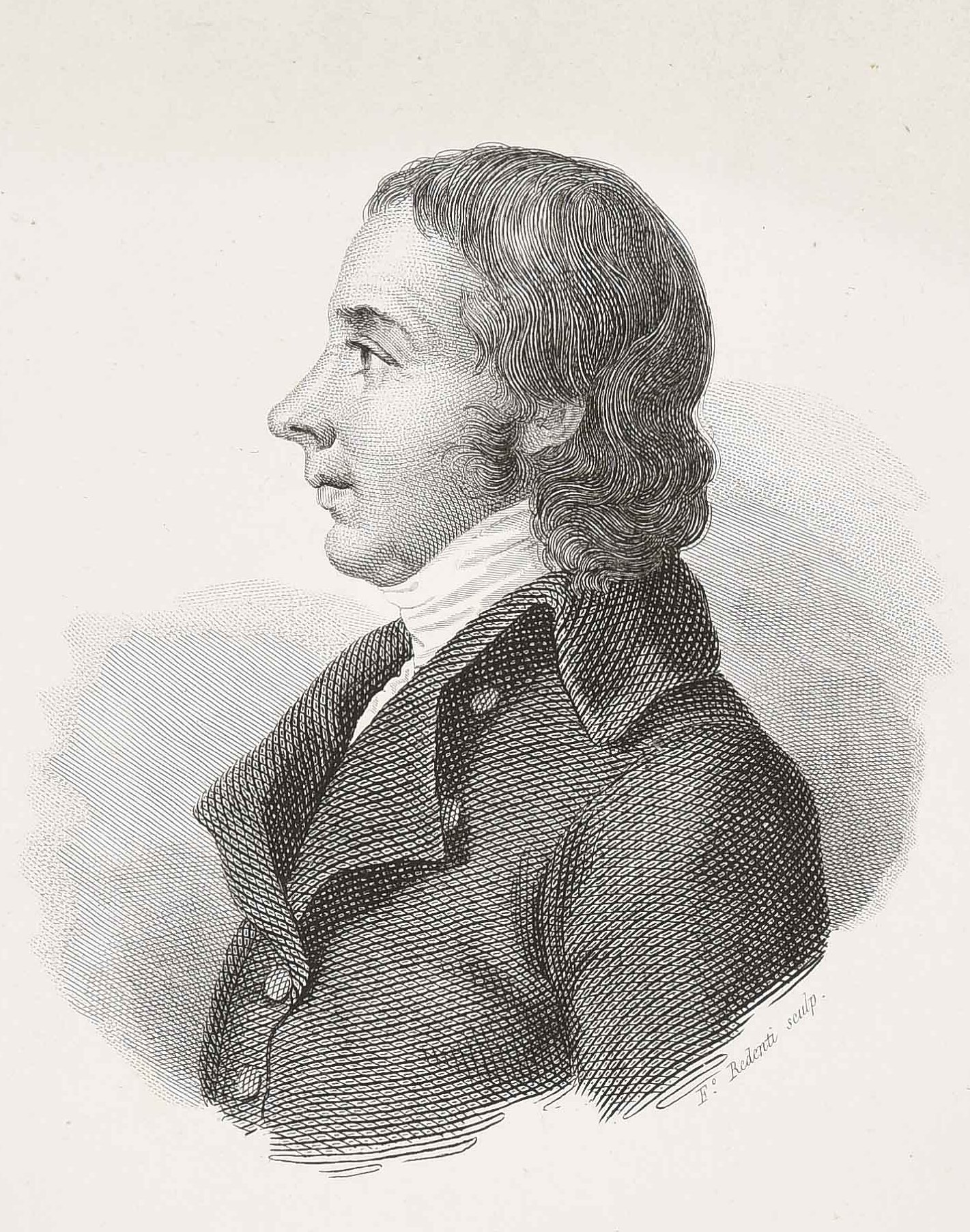
- Engraved portrait of Lorenzo Mascheroni by Francesco Redenti (1837)
- Born: 13 May 1750; Bergamo, Duchy of Milan (now Italy)
- Died: 14 July 1800 (aged 50); Paris, France
- Occupations: Catholic priest; Mathematician
- Known for: Mohr–Mascheroni theorem Euler–Mascheroni constant
- Scientific career
- Institutions: University of Pavia

Ecclesiastical career
- Religion: Christianity
- Church: Catholic Church
- Ordained: 1774

Signature
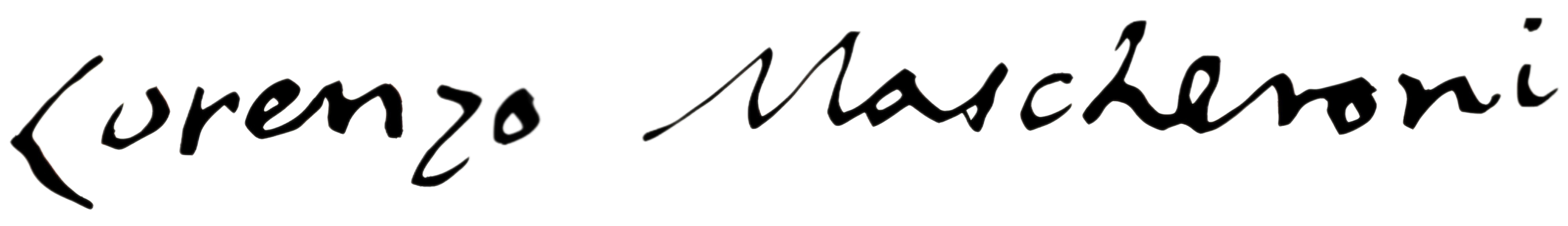

Lorenzo Mascheroni (Italian pronunciation: [loˈrɛntso maskeˈroːni]; 13 May 1750 – 14 July 1800) was an Italian geometer and mathematician best known for proving that all Euclidean constructions achievable with a compass and straightedge can also be done using only a compass (Mohr–Mascheroni theorem). He also calculated the Euler–Mascheroni constant to 32 decimal places.

== Biography ==
Lorenzo Mascheroni was born on 13 May 1750 in Castagneta, near Bergamo, Lombardy, to a wealthy merchant family. After seminary studies in Bergamo, he was ordained a Catholic priest in 1774, at the age of 17. His early interest in literary writing, in both Italian and Latin, was increasingly displaced by scientific – especially mathematical – studies. At first a professor of rhetoric, from 1778 he began teaching mathematics and physics at the seminary in Bergamo.

In 1786, Mascheroni succeeded Pietro Paoli as professor of mathematics at the University of Pavia and in 1789, he became the rector of the university, a position he held for the next four years. In 1790 and 1792, respectively, Mascheroni published two very important memoirs in which he was able to rectify the value of Euler's constant, reaching the calculus of thirty-two decimal digits.

Though a priest, Mascheroni was sympathetic to the ideals of the French Revolution. He enthusiastically supported the French armies that invaded Italy in 1796–99 and played a major role in the government of the Cisalpine Republic. Napoleon personally knew and admired Mascheroni and was instrumental in bringing his work to the attention of the learned circles of France. According to Howard Eves, the theorem and a construction problem bearing Napoleon's name were discovered by Mascheroni, who let the Emperor claim them for himself.

In 1797, Mascheroni was invited to Paris as a member of the international commission that created the metric system. During his stay in Paris, Mascheroni taught at various schools and made the acquaintance of Lagrange, Laplace, and Monge. On the occasion of the death of the mathematician and physicist Jean-Charles de Borda, he composed an elegy in Latin in his honour (1799). Mascheroni was unable to return to Italy due to the Austro-Russian invasion of Milan in 1799. He died in Paris the following year. On his death, his friend Vincenzo Monti dedicated to him the poem In morte di Lorenzo Mascheroni (three cantos published in 1801).

Mascheroni was a member of the Accademia Galileiana of Padua, the Royal Academy of Science and Letters of Mantua and the Accademia nazionale delle scienze. During his life, he published a substantial number of mathematical writings, the best known of which was his Geometria del Compasso (Geometry of the Compass, 1797).

== Contributions ==
=== Mohr–Mascheroni Theorem ===
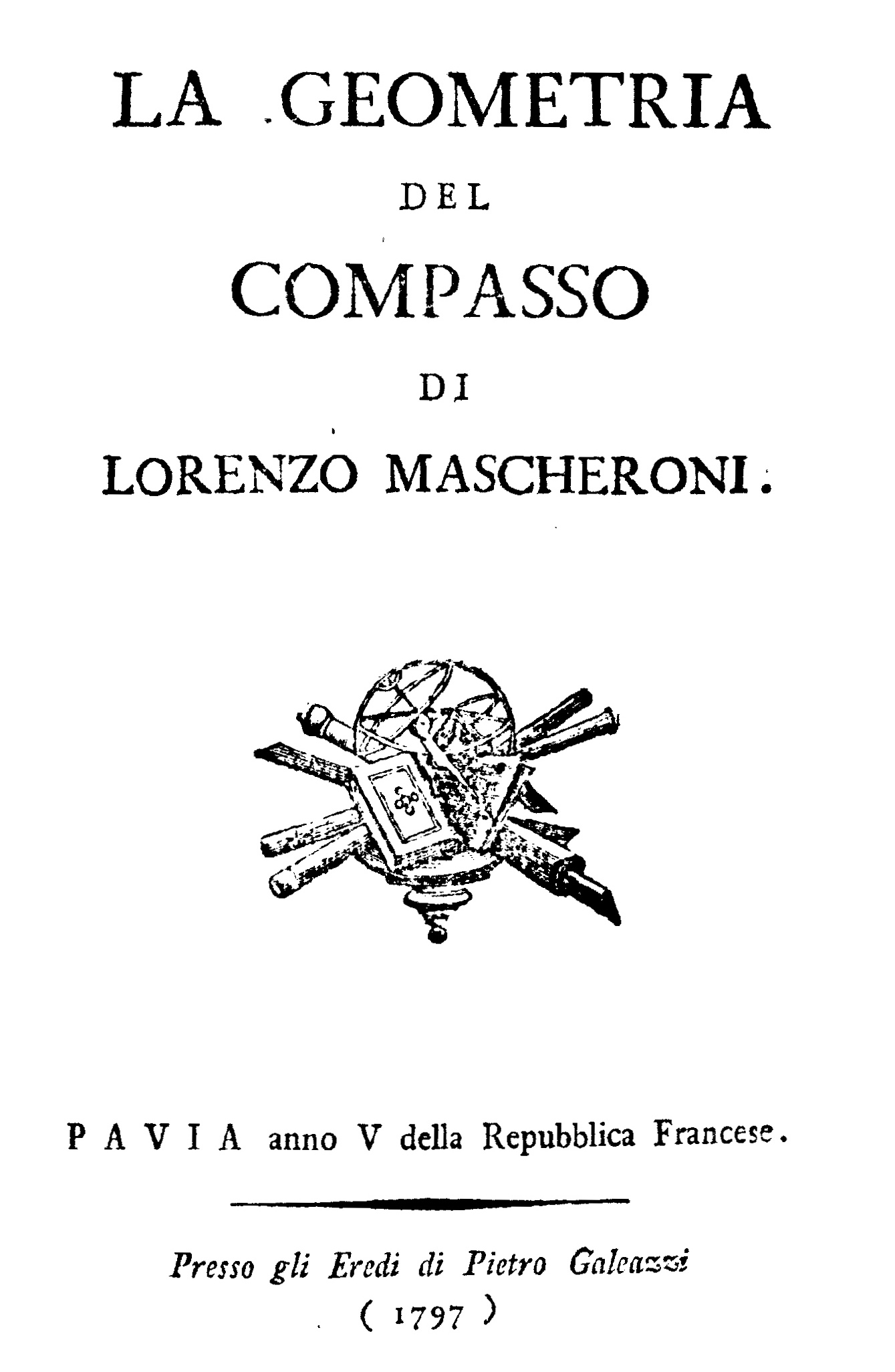
La geometria del compasso, 1797

In his work, Geometria del Compasso (Pavia, 1797), Mascheroni proved that any geometrical construction which can be done with compass and straightedge, can also be done with compasses alone. Mascheroni's Geometria del Compasso had a huge impact on the scientific community. It was soon translated into French by Antoine-Michel Carette (Paris, 1798), and into German by Johann Philipp Gruson (Berlin, 1825). A revised and augmented edition of the French translation was published in Paris and Brussels in 1828.

However, the priority for this result (now known as the Mohr–Mascheroni theorem) belongs to the Dane Georg Mohr, who had previously published a proof in 1672 in an obscure book, Euclides Danicus. Mohr's book was overlooked by European mathematicians, and Mascheroni, like the rest of the scientific community, was unaware of it, so it is Mascheroni whose name is generally associated with this result.

=== Euler–Mascheroni constant ===
In his Adnotationes ad calculum integralem Euleri (1790), Mascheroni extended several of Euler's results, especially those involving the Euler–Mascheroni constant, usually denoted as γ (gamma). Mascheroni was able to rectify Euler's value for γ and attempted to calculate the constant to 32 decimal places, but made errors in the 20th–22nd and 31st–32nd decimal places; starting from the 20th digit, he calculated ...1811209008239 when the correct value is ...0651209008240. The figure was corrected by Johann Georg von Soldner in 1809. Mascheroni's Adnotationes have been reprinted as an appendix in Euler's Opera Omnia.

== Honours ==
- Asteroid 27922 Mascheroni is named after him

== Main works ==
- Nuove ricerche sull'equilibrio delle volte (in Italian). Milano: Giovanni Silvestri. 1829. Bibcode:1829nrse.book.....M.
- Adnotationes ad calculum integralem Euleri (in Latin). Vol. 1. Ticini: ex typographia hered. Petri Galeatii. 1790.
- Adnotationes ad calculum integralem Euleri (in Latin). Vol. 2. Ticini: ex typographia hered. Petri Galeatii. 1792.
- Geometria del compasso (in Italian). Pavia: Pietro Galeazzi. 1797.

== Bibliography ==
- Loria, Gino; Alasia, Gregorio (1912). "Bibliographie de Mascheroni". Intermédiaire des mathématiciens. 19: 92–94.
- Cajori, Florian (1929). "A Forerunner of Mascheroni". The American Mathematical Monthly. 36 (7): 364–365. JSTOR 2298942.
- Court, N. A. (1958). "Mascheroni constructions". The Mathematics Teacher. 51 (5): 370–372. JSTOR 27955679.
- Benvenuto, Edoardo (1991). An Introduction to the History of Structural Mechanics. Vol. II. Berlin: Springer. pp. 412–424. ISBN 9781461229940.
- Gillispie, Charles Coulston (2004). Science and polity in France. The revolutionary and Napoleonic years. Princeton: Princeton University Press. ISBN 9780691115412.
- Matilde Dillon Wanke; Duccio Tongiorgi, eds. (2004). Lorenzo Mascheroni. Scienza e letteratura nell’età dei Lumi. Bergamo: Bergamo University Press. ISBN 9788887445497.
- Pepe, Luigi (2008). "MASCHERONI, Lorenzo". Dizionario Biografico degli Italiani (in Italian). Vol. 71: Marsilli–Massimino da Salerno. Rome: Istituto dell'Enciclopedia Italiana. ISBN 978-88-12-00032-6.
- Patergnani, Elisa; Pepe, Luigi (2022). "The Migration of Italian Mathematicians Between the 18th and 19th Centuries". In M. T. Borgato; C. Phili (eds.). In Foreign Lands: The Migrations of Scientists for Political or Economic Reasons. Cham, Switzerland: Springer. pp. 161–182. ISBN 978-3-030-80248-6.
