= Sławnikowice, Lower Silesian Voivodeship =

Sławnikowice
- Village
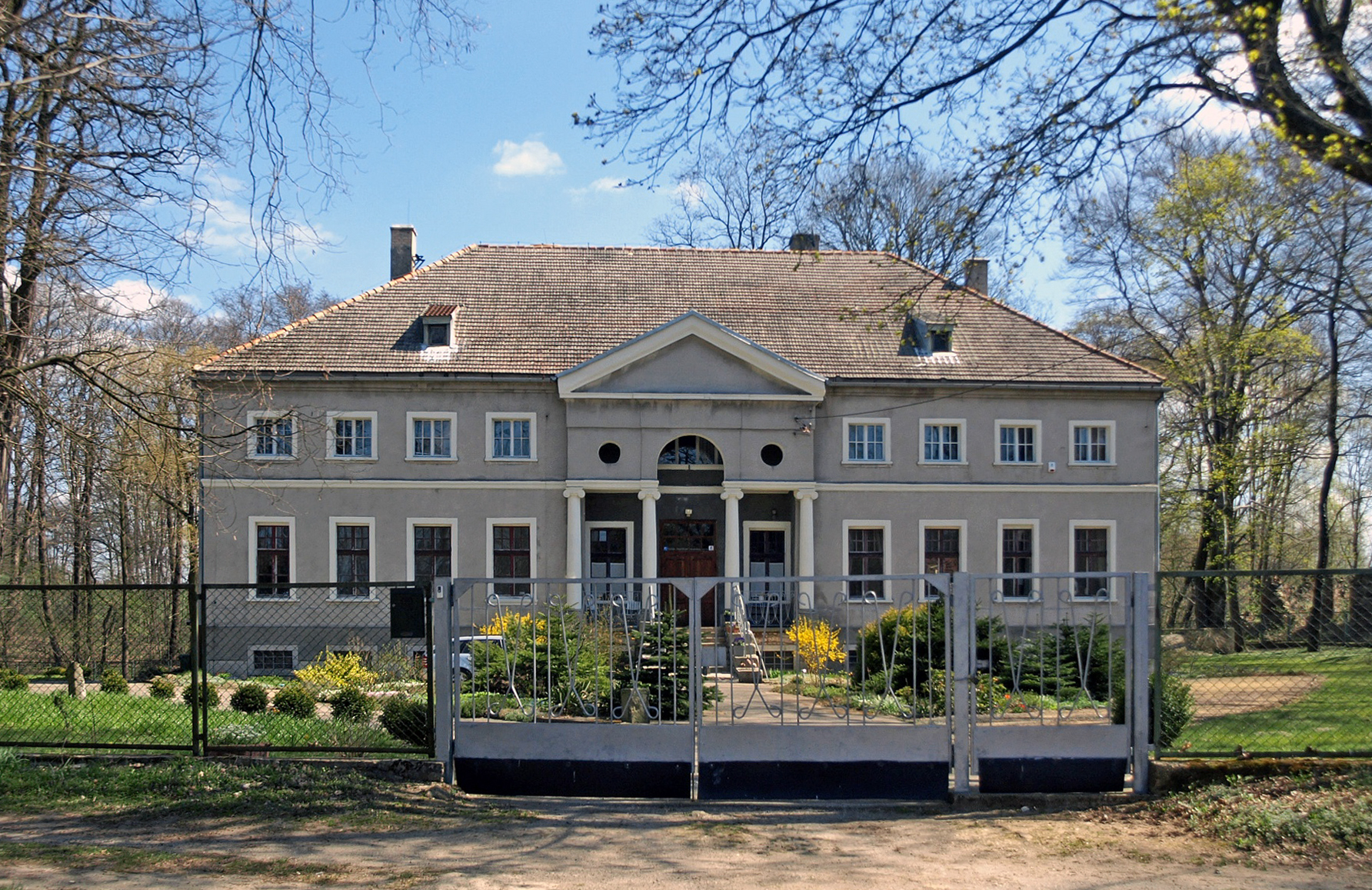
- Manor house

- Location within Poland
- Coordinates: 51°10′49″N 15°10′23″E
- Country: Poland
- Voivodeship: Lower Silesian
- County: Zgorzelec
- Gmina: Zgorzelec
- Population: 344

Sławnikowice [swavnikɔˈvit͡sɛ] is a village in the administrative district of Gmina Zgorzelec, within Zgorzelec County, Lower Silesian Voivodeship, in south-western Poland, close to the German border.

== Geography ==
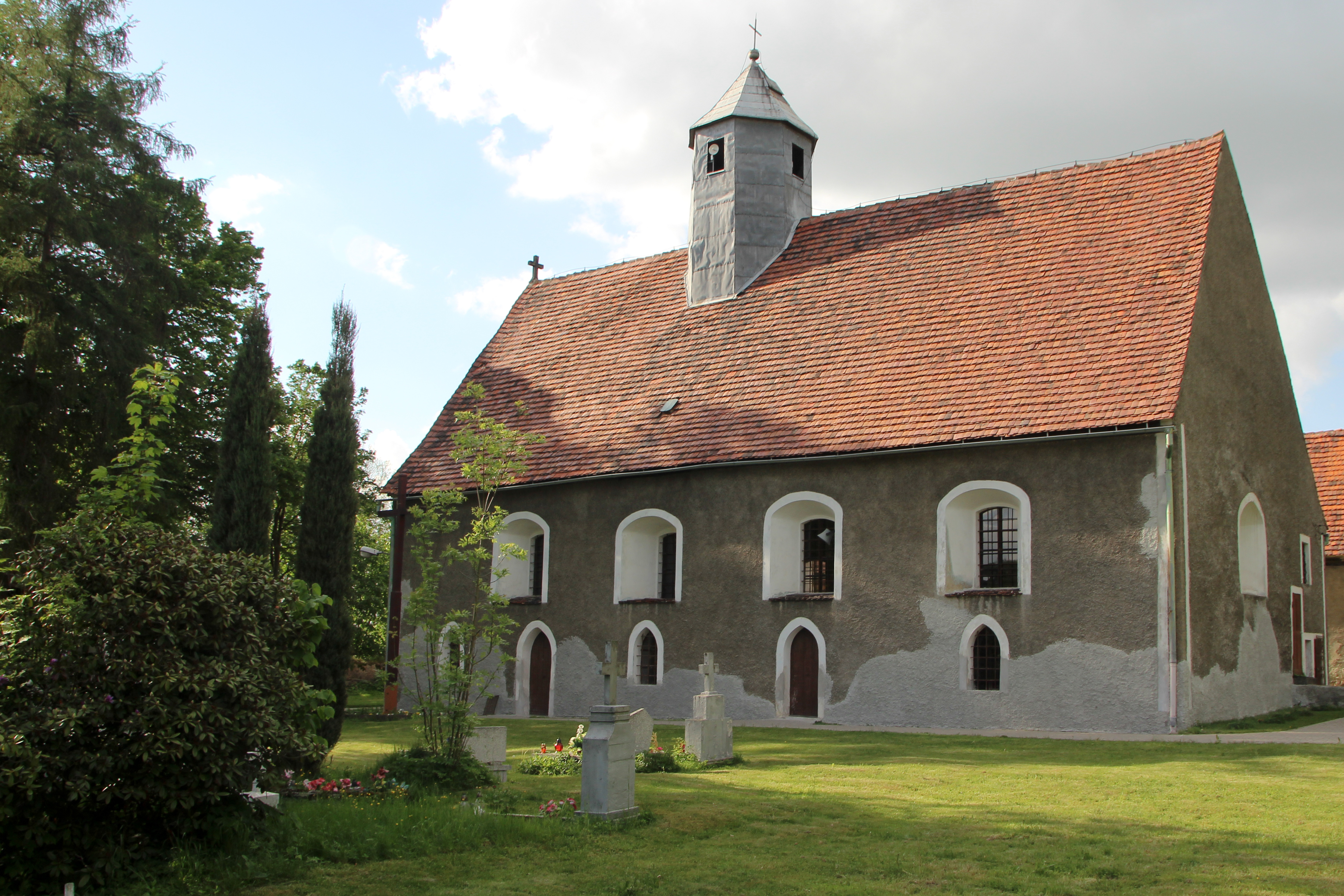
Village church

The Waldhufendorf is located in the Polish part of the Upper Lusatia historical region, approximately 12 km (7 mi) east of Zgorzelec and 131 km (81 mi) west of the regional capital Wrocław. The A4 autostrada (European route E40) runs about 4 km (2 mi) north of the village.

== History ==
Sławnikowice (then Keselingswalde) was first mentioned in a 1301 deed; with Lusatia it passed from the Bohemian Crown to the Electorate of Saxony upon the 1635 Peace of Prague and by resolution of the Vienna Congress was ceded to the Prussian province of Silesia in 1816.

The manor was held by the noble Tschirnhaus dynasty from 1483 onwards, residing here until 1714. Afterwards, the estates changed hands several times, they were finally acquired by the Witzleben dynasty in 1862. Following World War II east of the Oder-Neisse line fell to the Republic of Poland according to the Potsdam Agreement.

== Notable people ==
- Ehrenfried Walther von Tschirnhaus (1651–1708), mathematician, physicist, physician, and philosopher
- Georg Mohr (1640–1697), mathematician, died in Kieslingswalde.
