= Euclides Danicus =

1672 mathematics text

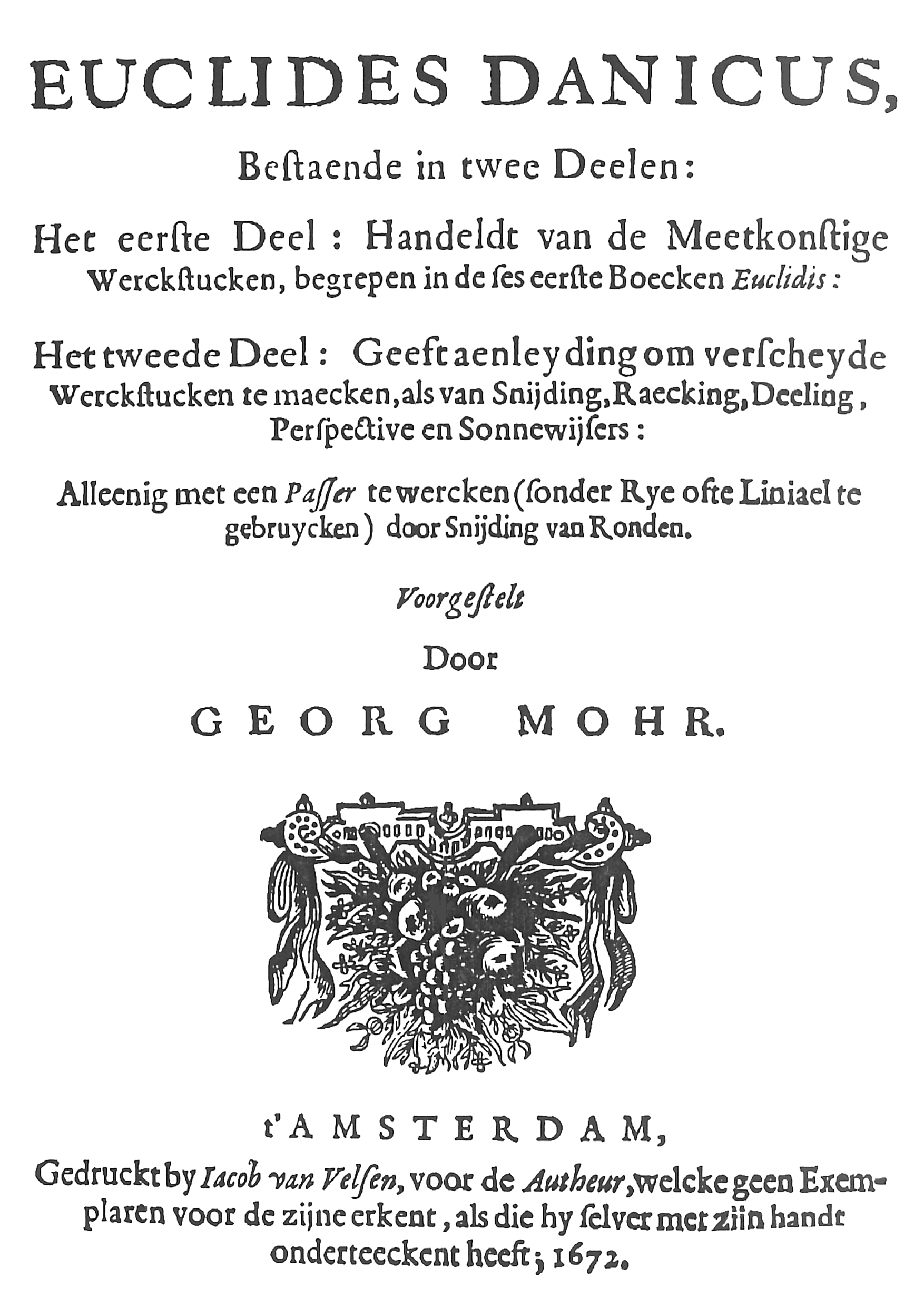
- Georg Mohr's Euclides Danicus, cover of the dutch version
- Author: George Mohr
- Language: Danish and Dutch

Euclides Danicus (lit. 'Danish Euclid') is one of three books of mathematics written by Georg Mohr. It was published in 1672 simultaneously in Copenhagen and Amsterdam, in Danish and Dutch respectively. It contains the first proof of the Mohr–Mascheroni theorem, which states that every geometric construction that can be performed using a compass and straightedge can also be done with compass alone.

== Contents ==
The book is divided into two parts. In the first part, Mohr shows how to perform all of the constructions of Euclid's Elements using a compass alone. In the second part, he includes some other specific constructions, including some related to the mathematics of the sundial.

== 1928 rediscovery of the book ==
Euclides Danicus languished in obscurity, possibly caused by its choice of language, until its rediscovery in 1928 in a bookshop in Copenhagen. Until then, the Mohr–Mascheroni theorem had been credited to Lorenzo Mascheroni, who published a proof in 1797, independently of Mohr's work. Soon after the rediscovery of Mohr's book, publications about it by Florian Cajori and Nathan Altshiller Court made its existence much more widely known. The Danish version was republished in facsimile in 1928 by the Royal Danish Academy of Sciences and Letters, with a foreword by Johannes Hjelmslev, and a German translation was published in 1929.

== Surviving copies ==
Only eight copies of the original publication of the book are known to survive. In 2005, one of these original copies was sold at auction, to Fry's Electronics, for what Gerald L. Alexanderson calls a "ridiculously low price": US$13,000.
