= Compass equivalence theorem =

Principle in compass and straightedge constructions

In geometry, the compass equivalence theorem is an important statement in compass and straightedge constructions. The tool advocated by Plato in these constructions is a divider or collapsing compass, that is, a compass that "collapses" whenever it is lifted from a page, so that it may not be directly used to transfer distances. The modern compass with its fixable aperture can be used to transfer distances directly and so appears to be a more powerful instrument. However, the compass equivalence theorem states that any construction via a "modern compass" may be attained with a collapsing compass. This can be shown by establishing that with a collapsing compass, given a circle in the plane, it is possible to construct another circle of equal radius, centered at any given point on the plane. This theorem is Proposition II of Book I of Euclid's Elements. The proof of this theorem has had a chequered history.

== Construction ==
Diagram for proof of Euclid I.2

The following construction and proof of correctness are given by Euclid in his Elements. Although there appear to be several cases in Euclid's treatment, depending upon choices made when interpreting ambiguous instructions, they all lead to the same conclusion, and so, specific choices are given below.

Given points A, B, and C, construct a circle centered at A with radius the length of B̅C̅ (that is, equivalent to the solid green circle, but centered at A).

- Draw a circle centered at A and passing through B and vice versa (the red circles). They will intersect at point D and form the equilateral triangle △ABD.
- Extend D̅B̅ past B and find the intersection of D̅B̅ and the circle ◯BC, labeled E.
- Create a circle centered at D and passing through E (the blue circle).
- Extend D̅A̅ past A and find the intersection of D̅A̅ and the circle ◯DE, labeled F.
- Construct a circle centered at A and passing through F (the dotted green circle)
- Because △ADB is an equilateral triangle, D̅A̅ = D̅B̅.
- Because E and F are on a circle around D, D̅E̅ = D̅F̅.
- Therefore, A̅F̅ = B̅E̅.
- Because E is on the circle ◯BC, B̅E̅ = B̅C̅.
- Therefore, A̅F̅ = B̅C̅.

== Alternative construction without straightedge ==
It is possible to prove compass equivalence without the use of the straightedge. This justifies the use of "fixed compass" moves (constructing a circle of a given radius at a different location) in proofs of the Mohr–Mascheroni theorem, which states that any construction possible with straightedge and compass can be accomplished with compass alone.

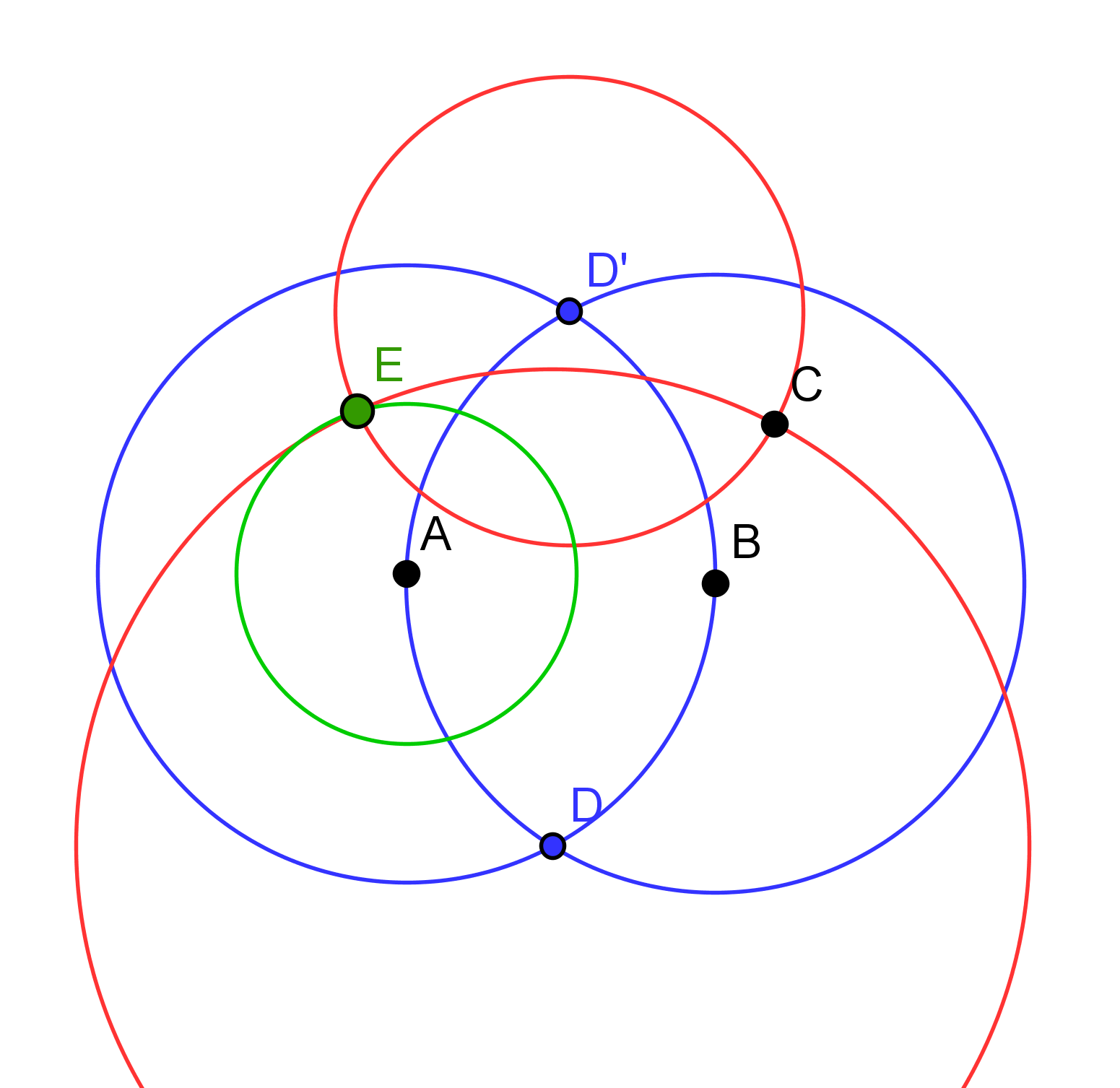
Construction without using straightedge

Given points A, B, and C, construct a circle centered at A with the radius B̅C̅, using only a collapsing compass and no straightedge.

- Draw a circle centered at A and passing through B and vice versa (the blue circles). They will intersect at points D and D'.
- Draw circles through C with centers at D and D' (the red circles). Label their other intersection E.
- Draw a circle (the green circle) with center A passing through E. This is the required circle.

There are several proofs of the correctness of this construction and it is often left as an exercise for the reader. Here is a modern one using transformations.

- The line DD' is the perpendicular bisector of A̅B̅. Thus A is the reflection of B through line DD'.
- By construction, E is the reflection of C through line DD'.
- Since reflection is an isometry, it follows that A̅E̅ = B̅C̅ as desired.
