= Georg Mohr =

Danish mathematician (1640–1697)

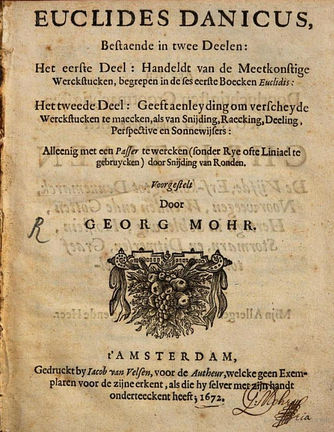

Jørgen Mohr (Latinised Georg(ius) Mohr; 1 April 1640 – 26 January 1697) was a Danish mathematician, known for being the first to prove the Mohr–Mascheroni theorem, which states that any geometric construction which can be done with compass and straightedge can also be done with compasses alone.

== Biography ==
Mohr was born in Copenhagen, the son of a tradesman named David Mohrendal. Beginning in 1662 he traveled to the Netherlands, to study mathematics with Christiaan Huygens. In 1672 he published his first book, Euclides Danicus, simultaneously in Copenhagen and Amsterdam, in Danish and Dutch respectively. This book, proving the Mohr–Mascheroni theorem 125 years earlier than Lorenzo Mascheroni, would languish in obscurity until its rediscovery in 1928. Mohr served in Franco-Dutch War in 1672–1673, and was taken prisoner by the French. By 1673, he had published his second book, Compendium Euclidis Curiosi. A third book was later mentioned by Mohr's son; for many years this was believed to be the Gegenübung auf Compendium Euclidis Curiosi but Andersen & Meyer (1985) argue that it must be a different book, and that the Gegenübung has a different author. As well as his work on geometry, Mohr contributed to the theory of nested radicals, with the aim of simplifying Cardano's formula for the roots of a cubic polynomial.

While in the Netherlands, Mohr became a friend of Ehrenfried Walther von Tschirnhaus. The two visited Gottfried Wilhelm Leibniz in France and John Collins in England together. Mohr returned to Denmark in 1681; he had dedicated Euclides Danicus to Christian V and hoped for a position in exchange, but was offered only a position as a shipyard supervisor, which he declined. He married Elizabeth von der Linde of Copenhagen on 19 July 1687, and soon after returned to Holland; their son, Peter Georg Mohrenthal, eventually settled in Dresden as a bookseller and publisher. In 1695 he took a job with Tschirnhaus, and spent his last few years as a guest in Tschirnhaus's house. He died in Kieslingswalde near Görlitz, Germany.

The Georg Mohr Competition, which is used to select Danish participants to the International Mathematical Olympiad, is named after Mohr.
