= Spirolateral =

Geometric polygon

Simple spirolaterals
3_{90°} (4 cycles)	3_{108°} (5 cycles)	9_{90°} ccw spiral	9_{90°} (4 cycles)
100_{120°} spiral		100_{120°} (4 cycles)	

In Euclidean geometry, a spirolateral is a polygon created by a sequence of fixed vertex internal angles and sequential edge lengths 1,2,3,...,n which repeat until the figure closes. The number of repeats needed is called its cycles. A simple spirolateral has only positive angles. A simple spiral approximates of a portion of an archimedean spiral. A general spirolateral allows positive and negative angles.

A spirolateral which completes in one turn is a simple polygon, while requiring more than 1 turn is a star polygon and must be self-crossing. A simple spirolateral can be an equangular simple polygon <p> with p vertices, or an equiangular star polygon <p/q> with p vertices and q turns.

Spirolaterals were invented and named by Frank C. Odds as a teenager in 1962, as square spirolaterals with 90° angles, drawn on graph paper. In 1970, Odds discovered triangular and hexagonal spirolateral, with 60° and 120° angles, can be drawn on isometric (triangular) graph paper. Odds wrote to Martin Gardner who encouraged him to publish the results in Mathematics Teacher in 1973.

The process can be represented in turtle graphics, alternating turn angle and move forward instructions, but limiting the turn to a fixed rational angle.

The smallest golygon is a spirolateral, 7_{90°}^{4}, made with 7 right angles, and length 4 follow concave turns. Golygons are different in that they must close with a single sequence 1,2,3,..n, while a spirolateral will repeat that sequence until it closes.

== Classifications ==
Varied cases
Simple 6_{90°}, 2 cycle, 3 turn	Regular unexpected closed spirolateral, 8_{90°}^{1,5}	Unexpectedly closed spirolateral 7_{90°}^{4}	Crossed rectangle (1,2,-1,-2)_{60°}
Crossed hexagon (1,1,2,-1,-1,-2)_{90°}	(-1.2.4.3.2)_{60°}	(2...4)_{90°}	(2,1,-2,3,-4,3)_{120°}

A simple spirolateral has turns all the same direction. It is denoted by n_{θ}, where n is the number of sequential integer edge lengths and θ is the internal angle, as any rational divisor of 360°. Sequential edge lengths can be expressed explicitly as (1,2,...,n)_{θ}.

Note: The angle θ can be confusing because it represents the internal angle, while the supplementary turn angle can make more sense. These two angles are the same for 90°.

This defines an equiangular polygon of the form <kp/kq>, where angle θ = 180(1−2q/p), with k = n/d, and d = gcd(n,p). If d = n, the pattern never closes. Otherwise it has kp vertices and kq density. The cyclic symmetry of a simple spirolateral is p/d-fold.

A regular polygon, {p} is a special case of a spirolateral, 1_{180(1−2/p)°}. A regular star polygon, {p/q}, is a special case of a spirolateral, 1_{180(1−2q/p)°}. An isogonal polygon, is a special case spirolateral, 2_{180(1−2/p)°} or 2_{180(1−2q/p)°}.

A general spirolateral can turn left or right. It is denoted by n_{θ}^{a_{1},...,a_{k}}, where a_{i} are indices with negative or concave angles. For example, 2_{60°}^{2} is a crossed rectangle with ±60° internal angles, bending left or right.

An unexpected closed spirolateral returns to the first vertex on a single cycle. Only general spirolaterals may not close. A golygon is a regular unexpected closed spirolateral that closes from the expected direction. An irregular unexpected closed spirolateral is one that returns to the first point but from the wrong direction. For example 7_{90°}^{4}. It takes 4 cycles to return to the start in the correct direction.

A modern spirolateral, also called a loop-de-loops by Educator Anna Weltman, is denoted by (i_{1},...,i_{n})_{θ}, allowing any sequence of integers as the edge lengths, i_{1} to i_{n}. For example, (2,3,4)_{90°} has edge lengths 2,3,4 repeating. Opposite direction turns can be given a negative integer edge length. For example, a crossed rectangle can be given as (1,2,−1,−2)_{θ}.

An open spirolateral never closes. A simple spirolateral, n_{θ}, never closes if nθ is a multiple of 360°, gcd(p,n) = p. A general spirolateral can also be open if half of the angles are positive, half negative.

A (partial) infinite simple spirolateral, 4_{90°}

== Closure ==
The number of cycles it takes to close a spirolateral, n_{θ}, with k opposite turns can be computed like so. Define p and q such that p/q=360/(180-θ). if the fraction (p-2q)(n-2k)/2p is reduced fully to a/b, then the figure repeats after b cycles, and complete a total turns. If b=1, the figure never closes.

Explicitly, the number of cycles is 2p/d, where d=gcd((p-2q)(n-2k),2p). If d=2p, it closes on 1 cycle or never.

The number of cycles can be seen as the rotational symmetry order of the spirolateral.

n_{90°}

1_{90°}, 4 cycle, 1 turn

2_{90°}, 2 cycle, 1 turn

3_{90°}, 4 cycle, 3 turn

4_{90°}, never closes

5_{90°}, 4 cycle, 5 turn

6_{90°}, 2 cycle, 3 turn

7_{90°}, 4 cycle, 6 turns

8_{90°}, never closes

9_{90°}, 4 cycle, 9 turn

10_{90°}, 2 cycle, 5 turn

n_{60°}

1_{60°}, 3 cycle, 1 turn

2_{60°}, 3 cycle, 2 turn

3_{60°}, never closes

4_{60°}, 3 cycle, 4 turn

5_{60°}, 3 cycle, 5 turn

6_{60°}, never closes

7_{60°}, 3 cycle, 7 turn

8_{60°}, 3 cycle, 8 turn

9_{60°}, never closes

10_{60°}, 3 cycle, 10 turn

== Small simple spirolaterals ==
Spirolaterals can be constructed from any rational divisor of 360°. The first table's columns sample angles from small regular polygons and second table from star polygons, with examples up to n = 6.

An equiangular polygon <p/q> has p vertices and q density. <np/nq> can be reduced by d = gcd(n,p).

Small whole divisor angles

Simple spirolaterals (whole divisors p) n_{θ} or (1,2,...,n)_{θ}
θ	60°	90°	108°	120°	128 4/7°	135°	140°	144°	147 3/11°	150°
180-θ Turn angle	120°	90°	72°	60°	51 3/7°	45°	40°	36°	32 8/11°	30°
n_{θ} \ p	3	4	5	6	7	8	9	10	11	12
1_{θ} Regular {p}	1_{60°} {3}	1_{90°} {4}	1_{108°} {5}	1_{120°} {6}	1_{128.57°} {7}	1_{135°} {8}	1_{140°} {9}	1_{144°} {10}	1_{147.27°} {11}	1_{150°} {12}
2_{θ} Isogonal <2p/2>	2_{60°} <6/2>	2_{90°} <8/2> → <4>	2_{108°} <10/2>	2_{120°} <12/2> → <6>	2_{128.57°} <14/2>	2_{135°} <16/2> → <8>	2_{140°} <18/2>	2_{144°} <20/2> → <10>	2_{147°} <22/2>	2_{150°} <24/2> → <12>
3_{θ} 2-isogonal <3p/3>	3_{60°} open	3_{90°} <12/3>	3_{108°} <15/3>	3_{120°} <18/3> → <6>	3_{128.57°} <21/3>	3_{135°} <24/3>	3_{140°} <27/3> → <9>	3_{144°} <30/3>	3_{147°} <33/3>	3_{150°} <36/3> → <12>
4_{θ} 3-isogonal <4p/4>	4_{60°} <12/4>	4_{90°} open	4_{108°} <20/4>	4_{120°} <24/4> → <12/2>	4_{128.57°} <28/4>	4_{135°} <32/4> → <8>	4_{140°} <36/4>	4_{144°} <40/4> → <20/2>	4_{147°} <44/4>	4_{150°} <48/4> → <12>
5_{θ} 4-isogonal <5p/5>	5_{60°} <15/5>	5_{90°} <20/5>	5_{108°} open	5_{120°} <30/5>	5_{128.57°} <35/5>	5_{135°} <40/5>	5_{140°} <45/5>	5_{144°} <50/5> → <10>	5_{147°} <55/5>	5_{150°} <60/5>
6_{θ} 5-isogonal <6p/6>	6_{60°} Open	6_{90°} <24/6> → <12/3>	6_{108°} <30/6>	6_{120°} Open	6_{128.57°} <42/6>	6_{135°} <48/6> → <24/3>	6_{140°} <54/6> → <18/2>	6_{144°} <60/6> → <30/3>	6_{147°} <66/6>	6_{150°} <72/6> → <12>

Small rational divisor angles

Simple spirolaterals (rational divisors p/q) n_{θ} or (1,2,...,n)_{θ}
θ	15°	16 4/11°	20°	25 5/7°	30°	36°	45°	49 1/11°	72°	77 1/7°	81 9/11°	100°	114 6/11°
180-θ Turn angle	165°	163 7/11°	160°	154 2/7°	150°	144°	135°	130 10/11°	108°	102 6/7°	98 2/11°	80°	65 5/11°
n_{θ} \ p/q	24/11	11/5	9/4	7/3	12/5	5/2	8/3	11/4	10/3	7/2	11/3	9/2	11/2
1_{θ} Regular {p/q}	1_{15°} {24/11}	1_{16.36°} {11/5}	1_{20°} {9/4}	1_{25.71°} {7/3}	1_{30°} {12/5}	1_{36°} {5/2}	1_{45°} {8/3}	1_{49.10°} {11/4}	1_{72°} {10/3}	1_{77.14°} {7/2}	1_{81.82°} {11/3}	1_{100°} {9/2}	1_{114.55°} {11/2}
2_{θ} Isogonal <2p/2q>	2_{15°} <48/22> → <24/11>	2_{16.36°} <22/10>	2_{20°} <18/8>	2_{25.71°} <14/6>	2_{30°} <24/10> → <12/5>	2_{36°} <10/4>	2_{45°} <16/6> → <8/3>	2_{49.10°} <22/8>	2_{72°} <20/6> → <10/3>	2_{77.14°} <14/4>	2_{81.82°} <22/6>	2_{100°} <18/4>	2_{114.55°} <22/4>
3_{θ} 2-isogonal <3p/3q>	3_{15°} <72/33> → <24/11>	3_{16.36°} <33/15>	3_{20°} <27/12> → <9/4>	3_{25.71°} <21/9>	3_{30°} <36/15> → <12/5>	3_{36°} <15/6>	3_{45°} <24/9>	3_{49.10°} <33/12>	3_{72°} <30/9>	3_{77.14°} <21/6>	3_{81.82°} <33/9>	3_{100°} <27/6> → <9/2>	3_{114.55°} <33/6>
4_{θ} 3-isogonal <4p/4q>	4_{15°} <96/44> → <24/11>	4_{16.36°} <44/20>	4_{20°} <36/12>	4_{25.71°} <28/4>	4_{30°} <48/40> → <12/5>	4_{36°} <20/8>	4_{45°} <32/12> → <8/3>	4_{49.10°} <44/16>	4_{72°} <40/12> → <20/6>	4_{77.14°} <28/8>	4_{81.82°} <44/12>	4_{100°} <36/8>	4_{114.55°} <44/8>
5_{θ} 4-isogonal <5p/5q>	5_{15°} <120/55>	5_{16.36°} <55/25>	5_{20°} <45/20>	5_{25.71°} <35/15>	5_{30°} <60/25>	5_{36°} open	5_{45°} <40/15>	5_{49.10°} <55/20>	5_{72°} <50/15> → <10/3>	5_{77.14°} <35/10>	5_{81.82°} <55/15>	5_{100°} <45/10>	5_{114.55°} <55/10>
6_{θ} 5-isogonal <6p/6q>	6_{15°} <144/66> → <24/11>	6_{16.36°} <66/30>	6_{20°} <54/24> → <18/8>	6_{25.71°} <42/18>	6_{30°} <72/30> → <12/5>	6_{36°} <30/12>	6_{45°} <48/18> → <24/9>	6_{49.10°} <66/24>	6_{72°} <60/18> → <30/9>	6_{77.14°} <42/12>	6_{81.82°} <66/18>	6_{100°} <54/12> → <18/4>	6_{114.55°} <66/12>

== See also ==
- Turtle graphics represent a computer language that defines an open or close path as move lengths and turn angles.
