= 9/4 =

9/4 may refer to:

- September 4 (month-day date notation)
- April 9 (day-month date notation)
- A type of enneagram
