= Viviani's theorem =

Theorem on equilateral triangles

For any interior point P, the sum of the lengths of the perpendiculars s + t + u equals the height of the equilateral triangle.

Viviani's theorem, named after Vincenzo Viviani, states that the sum of the shortest distances from any interior point to the sides of an equilateral triangle equals the length of the triangle's altitude. It is a theorem commonly employed in various math competitions, secondary school mathematics examinations, and has wide applicability to many problems in the real world.

== Proof ==
Visual proof of Viviani's theorem: 1. / Shortest distances from point P to sides of equilateral triangle ABC are shown.; 2. / Lines DE, FG, and HI parallel to AB, BC and CA, respectively, and passing through P define similar triangles PHE, PFI and PDG.; 3. / As these triangles are equilateral, their altitudes can be rotated to be vertical.; 4. / As PGCH is a parallelogram, triangle PHE can be slid up to show that the altitudes sum to that of triangle ABC.

This proof depends on the readily-proved proposition that the area of a triangle is half its base times its height—that is, half the product of one side with the altitude from that side.

Let ABC be an equilateral triangle whose height is h and whose side is a.

Let P be any point inside the triangle, and s, t, u the perpendicular distances of P from the sides. Draw a line from P to each of A, B, and C, forming three triangles PAB, PBC, and PCA.

Now, the areas of these triangles are $\frac{u \cdot a}{2}$, $\frac{s \cdot a}{2}$, and $\frac{t \cdot a}{2}$. They exactly fill the enclosing triangle, so the sum of these areas is equal to the area of the enclosing triangle. So we can write:

$$\frac{u \cdot a}{2} + \frac{s \cdot a}{2} + \frac{t \cdot a}{2} = \frac{h \cdot a}{2}$$

and thus

$$u + s + t = h$$

Q.E.D.

== Converse ==
The converse also holds: If the sum of the distances from an interior point of a triangle to the sides is independent of the location of the point, the triangle is equilateral.

== Applications ==
Flammability diagram for methane

Viviani's theorem means that lines parallel to the sides of an equilateral triangle give coordinates for making ternary plots, such as flammability diagrams.

More generally, they allow one to give coordinates on a regular simplex in the same way.

== Extensions ==
=== Parallelogram ===
The sum of the distances from any interior point of a parallelogram to the sides is independent of the location of the point. The converse also holds: If the sum of the distances from a point in the interior of a quadrilateral to the sides is independent of the location of the point, then the quadrilateral is a parallelogram.

The result generalizes to any 2n-gon with opposite sides parallel. Since the sum of distances between any pair of opposite parallel sides is constant, it follows that the sum of all pairwise sums between the pairs of parallel sides, is also constant. The converse in general is not true, as the result holds for an equilateral hexagon, which does not necessarily have opposite sides parallel.

=== Regular polygon ===
If a polygon is regular (both equiangular and equilateral), the sum of the distances to the sides from an interior point is independent of the location of the point. Specifically, it equals n times the apothem, where n is the number of sides and the apothem is the distance from the center to a side. However, the converse does not hold; the non-square parallelogram is a counterexample.

=== Equilateral polygon ===
The area proof given above for the equilateral triangle generalizes to any (convex) equilateral polygon. In other words, if a polygon has all sides equal, the sum of the distances from an interior point to the sides is independent of the location of the point. The result follows as before, since the equilateral n-gon can be divided up into n triangles all with equal base, say a, but with different heights. But the sum of all the areas of these triangles equal the area A of the polygon, so as before, A = 1/2 a (sum of the distances to the sides).

=== Equiangular polygon ===
The sum of the distances from an interior point to the sides of an equiangular polygon does not depend on the location of the point.

=== Convex polygon ===
A necessary and sufficient condition for a convex polygon to have a constant sum of distances from any interior point to the sides is that there exist three non-collinear interior points with equal sums of distances.

=== Regular polyhedron ===
The sum of the distances from any point in the interior of a regular polyhedron to the sides is independent of the location of the point. However, the converse does not hold, not even for tetrahedra.
