= Decagon =

Shape with ten sides

Regular decagon
- A regular decagon
- Type: Regular polygon
- Edges and vertices: 10
- Schläfli symbol: {10}, t{5}
- Symmetry group: Dihedral (D_{10}), order 2×10
- Internal angle (degrees): 144°
- Properties: Convex, cyclic, equilateral, isogonal, isotoxal
- Dual polygon: Self

In geometry, a decagon (from the Greek δέκα déka and γωνία gonía, "ten angles") is a ten-sided polygon or 10-gon. The total sum of the interior angles of a simple decagon is 1440°.

== Regular decagon ==
A regular decagon has all sides of equal length and each internal angle will always be equal to 144°. Its Schläfli symbol is {10} and can also be constructed as a truncated pentagon, t{5}, a quasiregular decagon alternating two types of edges.

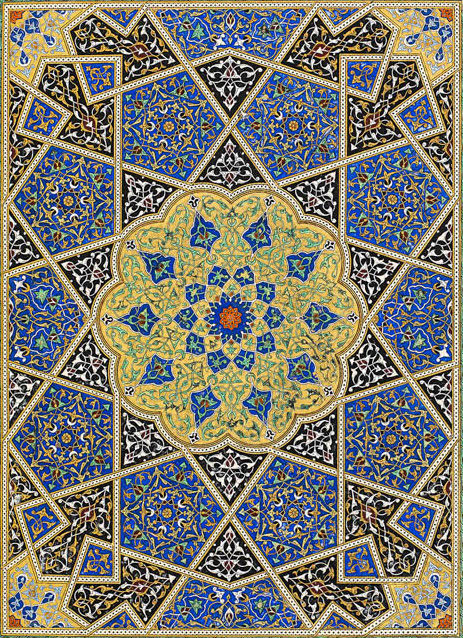
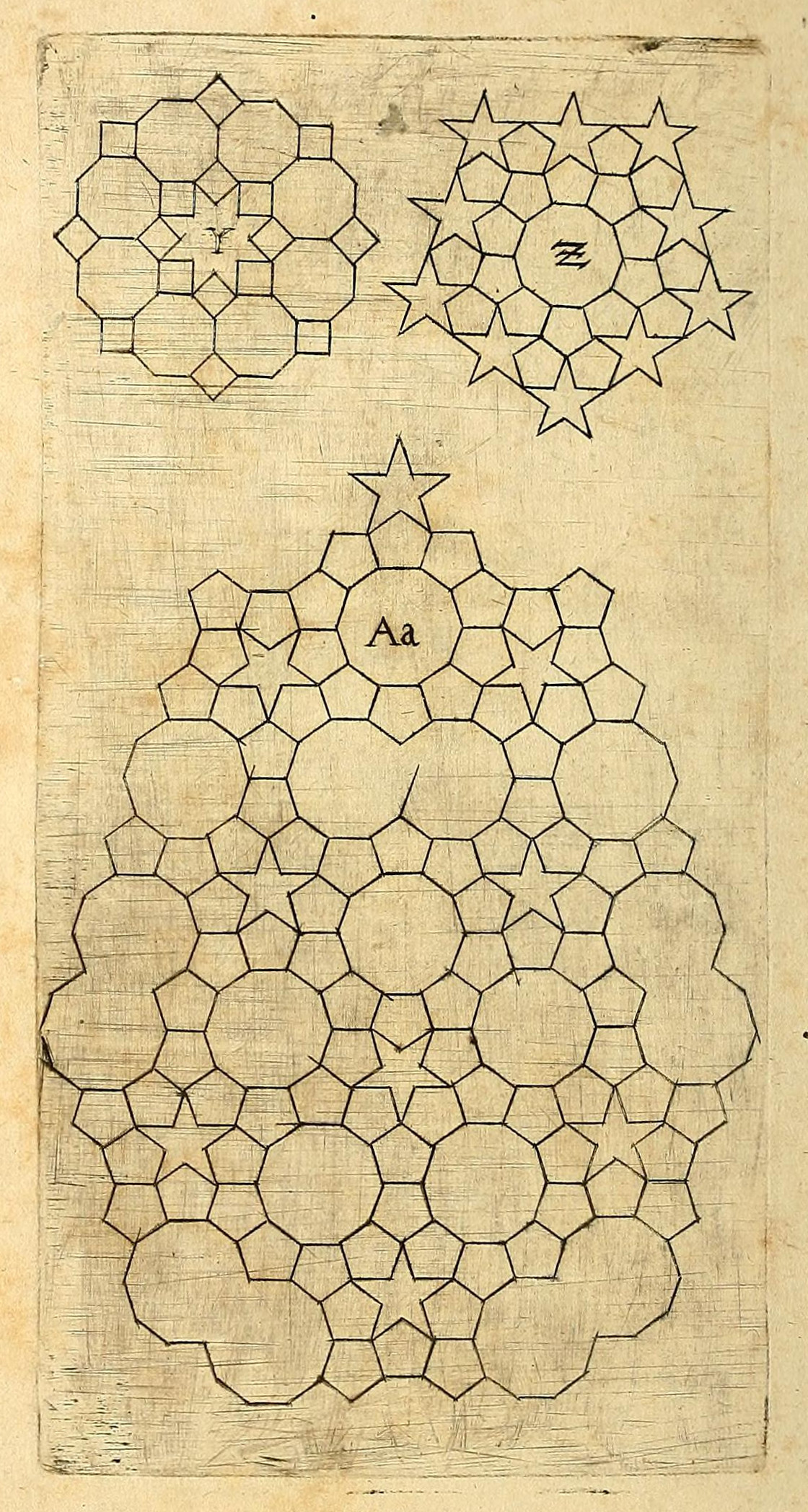
Decagons often appear in tilings with (partial) 5-fold symmetry. The images show an Islamic geometric pattern (15th century), an illustration in Kepler's Harmonices Mundi (1619) and a Penrose tiling.

=== Side length ===

The picture shows a regular decagon with side length $a$ and radius $R$ of the circumscribed circle.

- The triangle $E_{10}E_1M$ has two equally long legs with length $R$ and a base with length $a$
- The circle around $E_1$ with radius $a$ intersects $]M\,E_{10}[$ in a point $P$ (not designated in the picture).
- Now the triangle ${E_{10}E_1P}\;$ is an isosceles triangle with vertex $E_1$ and with base angles $m\angle E_1 E_{10} P = m\angle E_{10} P E_1 = 72^\circ \;$.
- Therefore $m\angle P E_1 E_{10} = 180^\circ -2\cdot 72^\circ = 36^\circ \;$. So $\; m\angle M E_1 P = 72^\circ- 36^\circ = 36^\circ\;$ and hence $\; E_1 M P\;$ is also an isosceles triangle with vertex $P$. The length of its legs is $a$, so the length of $[P\,E_{10}]$ is $R-a$.
- The isosceles triangles $E_{10} E_1 M\;$ and $P E_{10} E_1\;$ have equal angles of 36° at the vertex, and so they are similar, hence: $\;\frac{a}{R}=\frac{R-a}{a}$
- Multiplication with the denominators $R,a >0$ leads to the quadratic equation: $\;a^2=R^2-aR\;$
- This equation for the side length $a\,$ has one positive solution: $\;a=\frac{R}{2}(-1+\sqrt{5})$

So the regular decagon can be constructed with ruler and compass.

Further conclusions

$\;R=\frac{2a}{\sqrt{5}-1}=\frac{a}{2}(\sqrt{5}+1)\;$ and the base height of $\Delta\,E_{10} E_1 M\,$ (i.e. the length of $[M\,D]$) is $h = \sqrt{R^2-(a/2)^2}=\frac{a}{2}\sqrt{5+2\sqrt{5}}\;$ and the triangle has the area: $A_\Delta=\frac{a}{2}\cdot h = \frac{a^2}{4}\sqrt{5+2\sqrt{5}}$.

=== Area ===
The area of a regular decagon of side length a is given by:

$$A = \frac{5}{2} a^2\cot\left(\frac{\pi}{10} \right) =
\frac{5}{2} a^2\sqrt{5+2\sqrt{5}}
\simeq 7.694208843\,a^2$$

In terms of the apothem r (see also inscribed figure), the area is:

$$A = 10 \tan\left(\frac{\pi}{10}\right) r^2 =
2r^2\sqrt{5\left(5-2\sqrt5\right)}
\simeq 3.249196962\,r^2$$

In terms of the circumradius R, the area is:

$$A = 5 \sin\left(\frac{\pi}{5}\right) R^2
= \frac{5}{2}R^2\sqrt{\frac{5-\sqrt{5}}{2}}
\simeq 2.938926261\,R^2$$

An alternative formula is $A=2.5da$ where d is the distance between parallel sides, or the height when the decagon stands on one side as base, or the diameter of the decagon's inscribed circle. By simple trigonometry,

$$d=2a\left(\cos\tfrac{3\pi}{10}+\cos\tfrac{\pi}{10}\right),$$

and it can be written algebraically as

$$d=a\sqrt{5+2\sqrt{5}}.$$

=== Construction ===
As 10 = 2 × 5, a power of two times a Fermat prime, it follows that a regular decagon is constructible using compass and straightedge, or by an edge-bisection of a regular pentagon.

Construction of decagon

Construction of pentagon

An alternative (but similar) method is as follows:

1. Construct a pentagon in a circle by one of the methods shown in constructing a pentagon.
2. Extend a line from each vertex of the pentagon through the center of the circle to the opposite side of that same circle. Where each line cuts the circle is a vertex of the decagon. In other words, the image of a regular pentagon under a point reflection with respect of its center is a concentric congruent pentagon, and the two pentagons have in total the vertices of a concentric regular decagon.
3. The five corners of the pentagon constitute alternate corners of the decagon. Join these points to the adjacent new points to form the decagon.

== The golden ratio in decagon ==
Both in the construction with given circumcircle as well as with given side length is the golden ratio dividing a line segment by exterior division the determining construction element.

- In the construction with given circumcircle the circular arc around G with radius G̅E̅_{3̅} produces the segment A̅H̅, whose division corresponds to the golden ratio.

$$\frac{\overline{AM}}{\overline{MH}} = \frac{\overline{AH}}{\overline{AM}} = \frac{1+ \sqrt{5}}{2} = \Phi \approx 1.618 \text{.}$$

- In the construction with given side length the circular arc around D with radius D̅A̅ produces the segment E̅_{1̅0̅}F̅, whose division corresponds to the golden ratio.

$$\frac{\overline{E_1 E_{10}}}{\overline{E_1 F}} = \frac{\overline{E_{10} F}}{\overline{E_1 E_{10}}} = \frac{R}{a} = \frac{1+ \sqrt{5}}{2} =\Phi \approx 1.618 \text{.}$$

Decagon with given circumcircle, animation

Decagon with a given side length, animation

== Symmetry ==
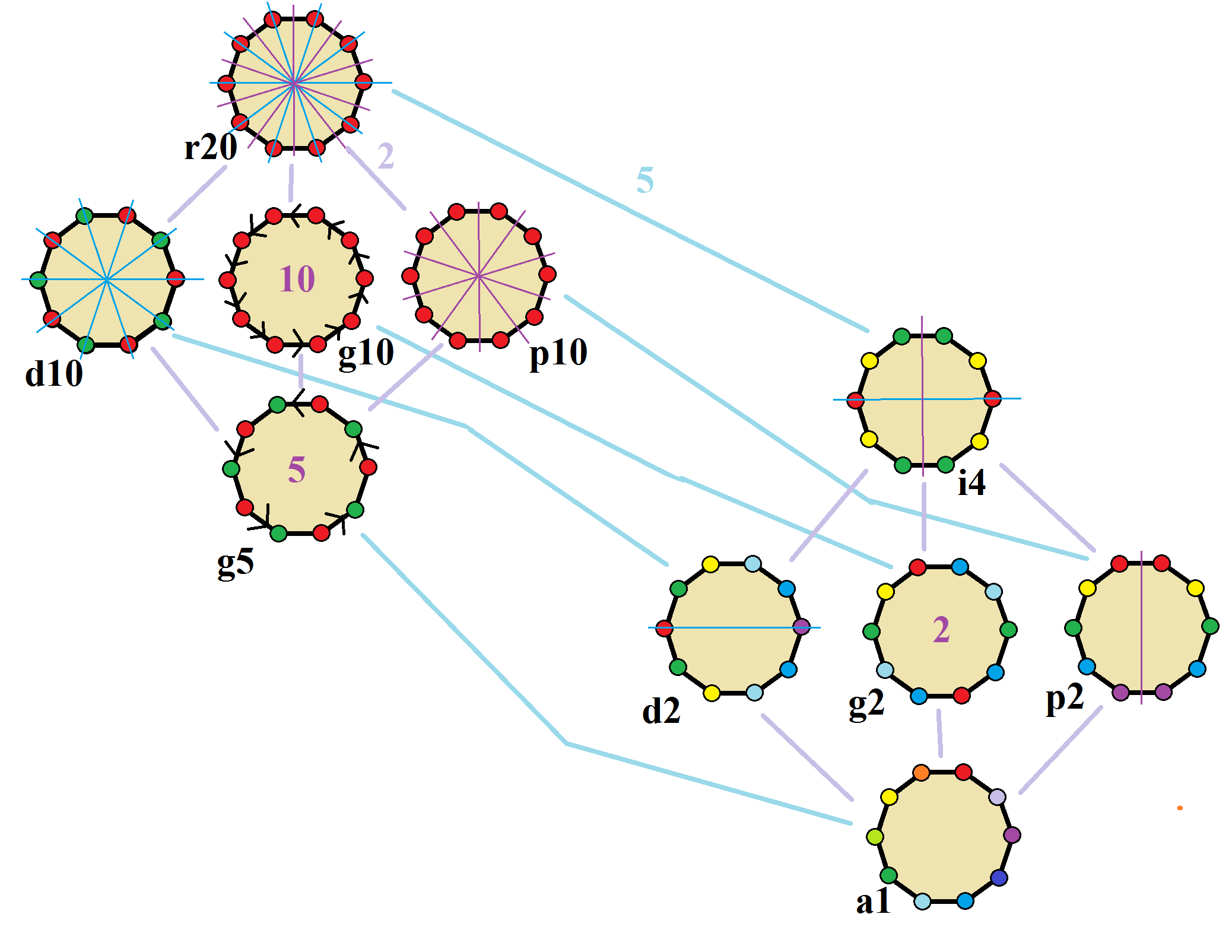
Symmetries of a regular decagon. Vertices are colored by their symmetry positions. Blue mirrors are drawn through vertices, and purple mirrors are drawn through edges. Gyration orders are given in the center.

The regular decagon has Dih_{10} symmetry, order 20. There are 3 subgroup dihedral symmetries: Dih_{5}, Dih_{2}, and Dih_{1}, and 4 cyclic group symmetries: Z_{10}, Z_{5}, Z_{2}, and Z_{1}.

These 8 symmetries can be seen in 10 distinct symmetries on the decagon, a larger number because the lines of reflections can either pass through vertices or edges. John Conway labels these by a letter and group order. Full symmetry of the regular form is r20 and no symmetry is labeled a1. The dihedral symmetries are divided depending on whether they pass through vertices (d for diagonal) or edges (p for perpendiculars), and i when reflection lines path through both edges and vertices. Cyclic symmetries in the middle column are labeled as g for their central gyration orders.

Each subgroup symmetry allows one or more degrees of freedom for irregular forms. Only the g10 subgroup has no degrees of freedom but can be seen as directed edges.

The highest symmetry irregular decagons are d10, an isogonal decagon constructed by five mirrors which can alternate long and short edges, and p10, an isotoxal decagon, constructed with equal edge lengths, but vertices alternating two different internal angles. These two forms are duals of each other and have half the symmetry order of the regular decagon.

== Dissection ==
10-cube projection	40 rhomb dissection

Coxeter states that every zonogon (a 2m-gon whose opposite sides are parallel and of equal length) can be dissected into m(m−1)/2 parallelograms. In particular this is true for regular polygons with evenly many sides, in which case the parallelograms are all rhombi. For the regular decagon, m = 5, and it can be divided into 10 rhombs, with examples shown below. This decomposition can be seen as 10 of 80 faces in a Petrie polygon projection plane of the 5-cube. A dissection is based on 10 of 30 faces of the rhombic triacontahedron. The list OEIS: A006245 defines the number of solutions as 62, with 2 orientations for the first symmetric form, and 10 orientations for the other 6.

Regular decagon dissected into 10 rhombi
5-cube

== Skew decagon ==
3 regular skew zig-zag decagons
{5}#{ }	{5/2}#{ }	{5/3}#{ }
A regular skew decagon is seen as zig-zagging edges of a pentagonal antiprism, a pentagrammic antiprism, and a pentagrammic crossed-antiprism.

A skew decagon is a skew polygon with 10 vertices and edges but not existing on the same plane. The interior of such a decagon is not generally defined. A skew zig-zag decagon has vertices alternating between two parallel planes.

A regular skew decagon is vertex-transitive with equal edge lengths. In 3-dimensions it will be a zig-zag skew decagon and can be seen in the vertices and side edges of a pentagonal antiprism, pentagrammic antiprism, and pentagrammic crossed-antiprism with the same D_{5d}, [2^{+},10] symmetry, order 20.

These can also be seen in these four convex polyhedra with icosahedral symmetry. The polygons on the perimeter of these projections are regular skew decagons.

Orthogonal projections of polyhedra on 5-fold axes
Dodecahedron	Icosahedron	Icosidodecahedron	Rhombic triacontahedron

=== Petrie polygons ===
The regular skew decagon is the Petrie polygon for many higher-dimensional polytopes, shown in these orthogonal projections in various Coxeter planes: The number of sides in the Petrie polygon is equal to the Coxeter number, h, for each symmetry family.

A_{9}	D_{6}		B_{5}	
9-simplex	4_{11}	1_{31}	5-orthoplex	5-cube

== See also ==
- Decagonal number and centered decagonal number, figurate numbers modeled on the decagon
- Decagram, a star polygon with the same vertex positions as the regular decagon
