= 9/2 =

9/2 may refer to:

- September 2 (month-day date notation)
- February 9 (day-month date notation)
- A type of enneagram
