= Dodecagon =

Polygon with 12 edges

Regular dodecagon
- A regular dodecagon
- Type: Regular polygon
- Edges and vertices: 12
- Schläfli symbol: {12}, t{6}, tt{3}
- Symmetry group: Dihedral (D_{12}), order 2×12
- Internal angle (degrees): 150°
- Properties: Convex, cyclic, equilateral, isogonal, isotoxal
- Dual polygon: Self

In geometry, a dodecagon, or 12-gon, is any twelve-sided polygon.

== Regular dodecagon ==
Three squares of sides R can be cut and rearranged into a dodecagon of circumradius R, yielding a proof without words that its area is 3R^{2}.

A regular dodecagon is a figure with sides of the same length and internal angles of the same size. It has twelve lines of reflective symmetry and rotational symmetry of order 12. A regular dodecagon is represented by the Schläfli symbol {12} and can be constructed as a truncated hexagon, t{6}, or a twice-truncated triangle, tt{3}. The internal angle at each vertex of a regular dodecagon is 150°.

=== Area ===
The area of a regular dodecagon of side length a is given by:
$$\begin{align} A & = 3 \cot\left(\frac{\pi}{12} \right) a^2 =
3 \left(2+\sqrt{3} \right) a^2 \\
& \simeq 11.19615242\,a^2
\end{align}$$

And in terms of the apothem r (see also inscribed figure), the area is:
$$\begin{align} A & = 12 \tan\left(\frac{\pi}{12}\right) r^2 =
12 \left(2-\sqrt{3} \right) r^2 \\
& \simeq 3.2153903\,r^2
\end{align}$$

In terms of the circumradius R, the area is:
$$A = 6 \sin\left(\frac{\pi}{6}\right) R^2 = 3 R^2$$

The span S of the dodecagon is the distance between two parallel sides and is equal to twice the apothem. A simple formula for area (given side length and span) is:
$$A = 3aS$$
This can be verified with the trigonometric relationship:
$$S = a(1+ 2\cos{30^{\circ}} + 2\cos{60^{\circ}})$$

=== Perimeter ===
The perimeter of a regular dodecagon in terms of circumradius is:
$$\begin{align} p & = 24R \sin\left(\frac{\pi}{12}\right) = 12R \sqrt{2 - \sqrt{3}}\\
& \simeq 6.21165708246\,R
\end{align}$$

The perimeter in terms of apothem is:
$$\begin{align} p & = 24r \tan\left(\frac{\pi}{12}\right) = 24r(2-\sqrt{3})\\
& \simeq 6.43078061835\,r
\end{align}$$
This coefficient is double the coefficient found in the apothem equation for area.

== Dodecagon construction ==
As 12 = 2^{2} × 3, regular dodecagon is constructible using compass-and-straightedge construction:

Construction of a regular dodecagon at a given circumcircle

Construction of a regular dodecagon
at a given side length, animation. (The construction is very similar to that of octagon at a given side length.)

== Dissection ==
12-cube	60 rhomb dissection

Isotoxal dodecagon

Coxeter states that every zonogon (a 2m-gon whose opposite sides are parallel and of equal length) can be dissected into m(m – 1)/2 parallelograms. In particular this is true for regular polygons with evenly many sides, in which case the parallelograms are all rhombi. For the regular dodecagon, m = 6, and it can be divided into 15: 3 squares, 6 wide 30° rhombs and 6 narrow 15° rhombs. This decomposition is based on a Petrie polygon projection of a 6-cube, with 15 of 240 faces. The sequence OEIS sequence A006245 defines the number of solutions as 908, including up to 12-fold rotations and chiral forms in reflection.

Dissection into 15 rhombs
6-cube

One of the ways the mathematical manipulative pattern blocks are used is in creating a number of different dodecagons. They are related to the rhombic dissections, with 3 60° rhombi merged into hexagons, half-hexagon trapezoids, or divided into 2 equilateral triangles.

Other regular dissections
Socolar tiling	Pattern blocks

== Symmetry ==
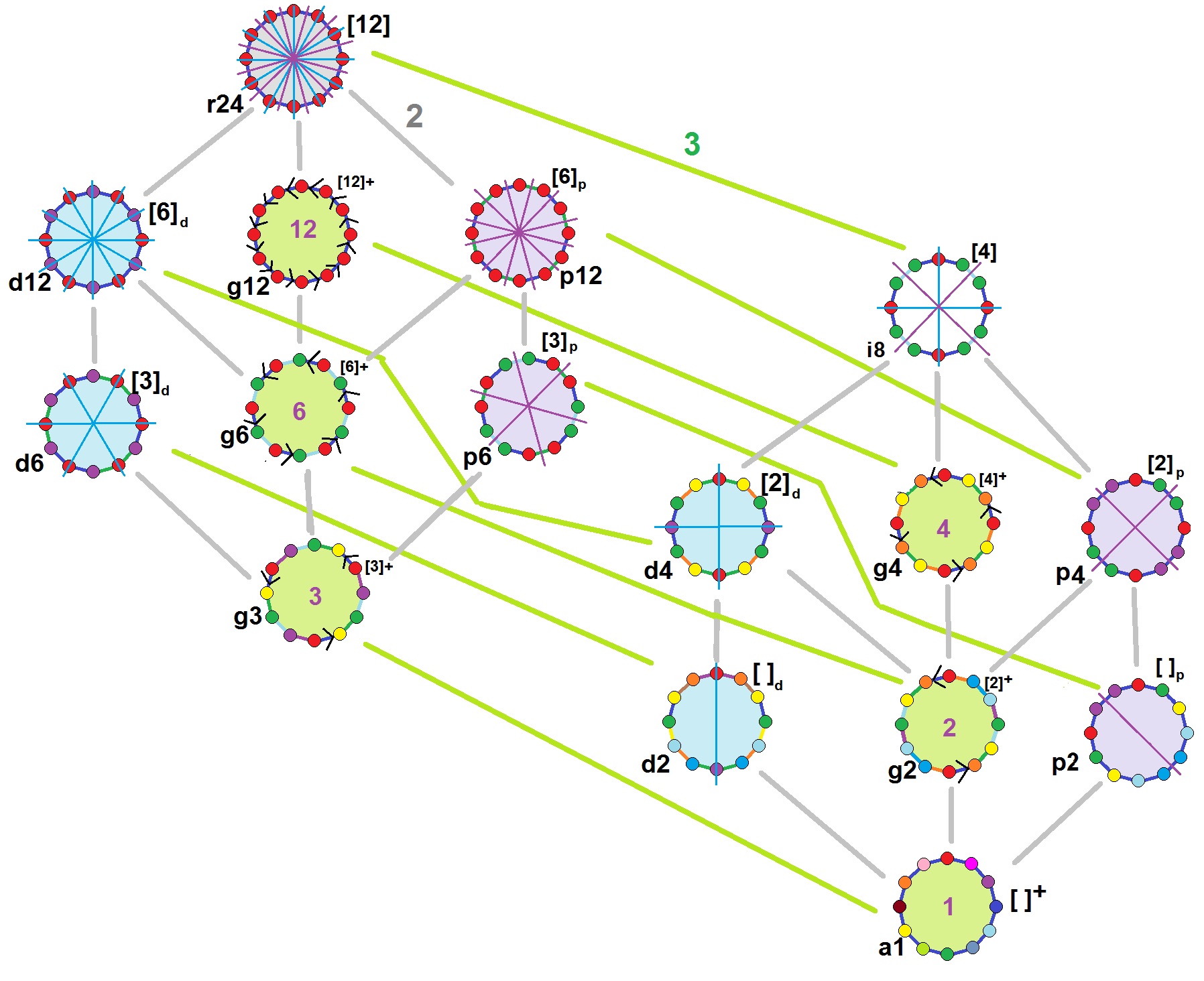
The symmetries of a regular dodecagon as shown with colors on edges and vertices. John Conway labels these lower symmetries with a letter and order of the symmetry follows the letter. He gives d (diagonal, diasymmetry) with mirror lines through vertices, p with mirror lines through edges (perpendicular, persymmetry) i with mirror lines through both vertices and edges (isosymmetry), and g for rotational (gyrosymmetry). a1 labels asymmetry. These lower symmetries allows degrees of freedoms in defining irregular dodecagons.

The regular dodecagon has Dih_{12} symmetry, order 24. There are 15 distinct subgroup dihedral and cyclic symmetries. Each subgroup symmetry allows one or more degrees of freedom for irregular forms. Only the g12 subgroup has no degrees of freedom but can be seen as directed edges.

Example dodecagons by symmetry
r24
d12	g12	p12	i8		
d6	g6	p6	d4	g4	p4
g3			d2	g2	p2
a1

== Occurrence ==
=== Tiling ===
A regular dodecagon can fill a plane vertex with other regular polygons in 4 ways:

3.12.12	4.6.12	3.3.4.12	3.4.3.12

Here are 3 example periodic plane tilings that use regular dodecagons, defined by their vertex configuration:

1-uniform		2-uniform
3.12.12	4.6.12	3.12.12; 3.4.3.12

== Skew dodecagon ==
A regular skew dodecagon seen as zig-zagging edges of a hexagonal antiprism.

A skew dodecagon is a skew polygon with 12 vertices and edges but not existing on the same plane. The interior of such a dodecagon is not generally defined. A skew zig-zag dodecagon has vertices alternating between two parallel planes.

A regular skew dodecagon is vertex-transitive with equal edge lengths. In 3-dimensions it will be a zig-zag skew dodecagon and can be seen in the vertices and side edges of a hexagonal antiprism with the same D_{5d}, [2^{+},10] symmetry, order 20. The dodecagrammic antiprism, s{2,24/5} and dodecagrammic crossed-antiprism, s{2,24/7} also have regular skew dodecagons.

=== Petrie polygons ===
The regular dodecagon is the Petrie polygon for many higher-dimensional polytopes, seen as orthogonal projections in Coxeter planes. Examples in 4 dimensions are the 24-cell, snub 24-cell, 6-6 duoprism, 6-6 duopyramid. In 6 dimensions 6-cube, 6-orthoplex, 2_{21}, 1_{22}. It is also the Petrie polygon for the grand 120-cell and great stellated 120-cell.

Regular skew dodecagons in higher dimensions
E_{6}		F_{4}		2G_{2} (4D)	
2_{21}	1_{22}	24-cell	Snub 24-cell	6-6 duopyramid	{6}×{6}
A_{11}	D_{7}		B_{6}		4A_{2}
11-simplex	(4_{11})	1_{41}	6-orthoplex	6-cube	{3}×{3}×{3}×{3}

== Related figures ==
A dodecagram is a 12-sided star polygon, represented by symbol {12/n}. There is one regular star polygon: {12/5}, using the same vertices, but connecting every fifth point. There are also three compounds: {12/2} is reduced to 2{6} as two hexagons, and {12/3} is reduced to 3{4} as three squares, {12/4} is reduced to 4{3} as four triangles, and {12/6} is reduced to 6{2} as six degenerate digons.

Stars and compounds
n	1	2	3	4	5	6
Form	Polygon	Compounds			Star polygon	Compound
Image	{12/1} = {12}	{12/2} or 2{6}	{12/3} or 3{4}	{12/4} or 4{3}	{12/5}	{12/6} or 6{2}

Deeper truncations of the regular dodecagon and dodecagrams can produce isogonal (vertex-transitive) intermediate star polygon forms with equal spaced vertices and two edge lengths. A truncated hexagon is a dodecagon, t{6}={12}. A quasitruncated hexagon, inverted as {6/5}, is a dodecagram: t{6/5}={12/5}.

Vertex-transitive truncations of the hexagon
Quasiregular	Isogonal	Quasiregular
t{6}={12}		t{6/5}={12/5}

== Examples in use ==
In block capitals, the letters E, H and X (and I in a slab serif font) have dodecagonal outlines. A cross is a dodecagon, as is the logo for the Chevrolet automobile division.

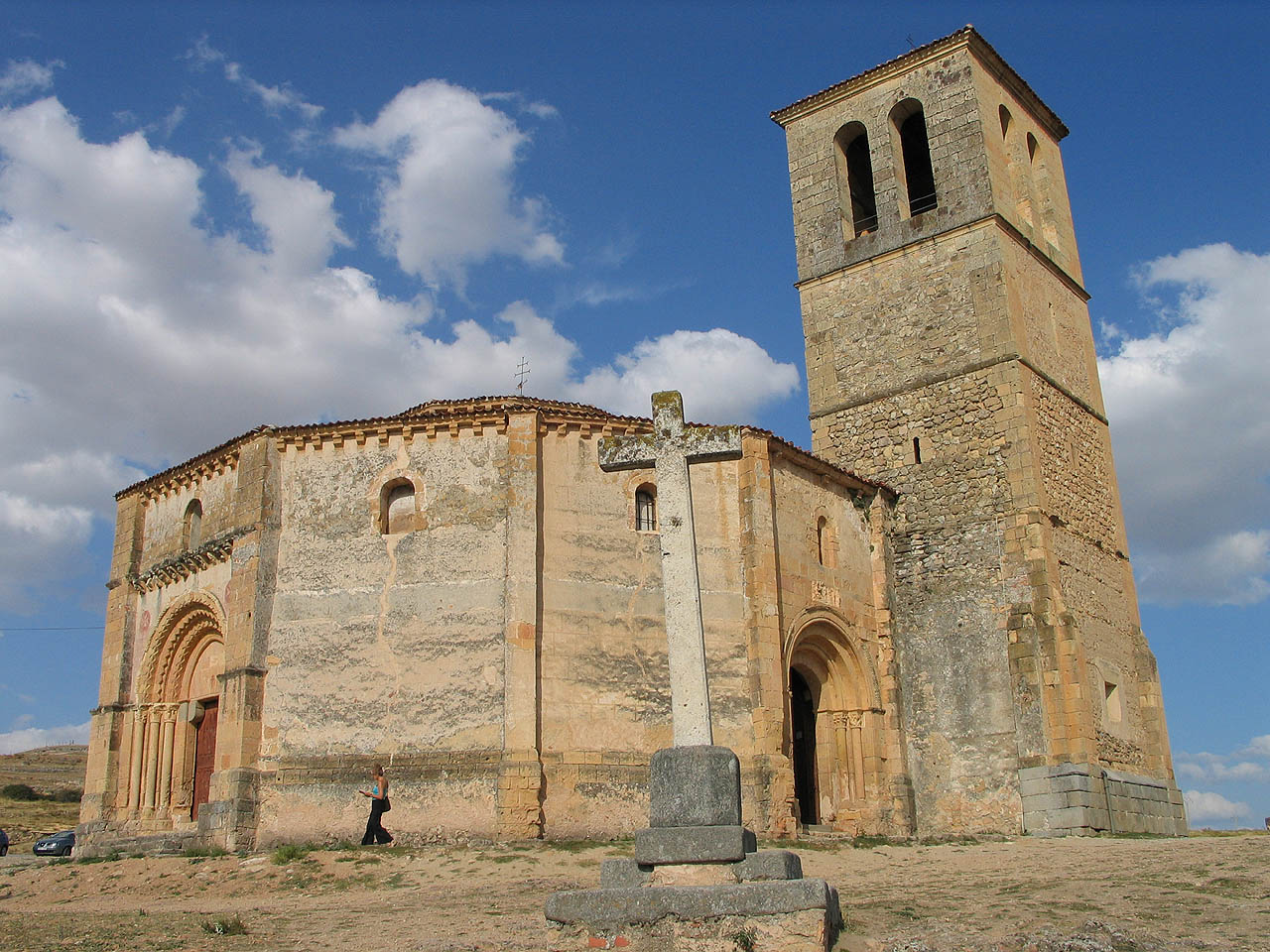
The Vera Cruz church in Segovia

The regular dodecagon features prominently in many buildings. The Torre del Oro is a dodecagonal military watchtower in Seville, southern Spain, built by the Almohad dynasty. The early thirteenth century Vera Cruz church in Segovia, Spain is dodecagonal. Another example is the Porta di Venere (Venus' Gate), in Spello, Italy, built in the 1st century BC has two dodecagonal towers, called "Propertius' Towers".

A 1942 British threepence, reverse

Regular dodecagonal coins include:

- British threepenny bit from 1937 to 1971, when it ceased to be legal tender.
- British One Pound Coin, introduced in 2017.
- Australian 50-cent coin
- Fijian 50 cents
- Tongan 50-seniti, since 1974
- Solomon Islands 50 cents
- Croatian 25 kuna
- Romanian 5000 lei, 2001–2005
- Canadian penny, 1982–1996
- South Vietnamese 20 đồng, 1968–1975
- Zambian 50 ngwee, 1969–1992
- Malawian 50 tambala, 1986–1995
- Mexican 20 centavos, 1992-2009
- Israeli 5 new shekel

== See also ==
- Dodecagonal number
- Dodecahedron – any polyhedron with 12 faces.
- Dodecagram
