= Golygon =

Polygon with right angles and consecutive lengths

The smallest golygon has 8 sides. It is the only solution with fewer than 16 sides. It contains two concave corners, and fits on an 8×10 grid. It is also a spirolateral, 8_{90°}^{1,5}.

A golygon, or more generally a serial isogon of 90°, is any polygon with all right angles (a rectilinear polygon) whose sides are consecutive integer lengths. Golygons were invented and named by Lee Sallows, and popularized by A.K. Dewdney in a 1990 Scientific American column (Smith). Variations on the definition of golygons involve allowing edges to cross, using sequences of edge lengths other than the consecutive integers, and considering turn angles other than 90°.

== Properties ==
In any golygon, all horizontal edges have the same parity as each other, as do all vertical edges. Therefore, the number n of sides must allow the solution of the system of equations

$$\pm 1 \pm 3 \pm \cdots \pm (n-1) = 0$$
$$\pm 2 \pm 4 \pm \cdots \pm n = 0.$$

It follows from this that n must be a multiple of 8. For example, in the figure we have $-1 + 3 + 5 - 7 = 0$ and $2 - 4 - 6 + 8 = 0$.

The number of golygons for a given permissible value of n may be computed efficiently using generating functions (sequence A007219 in the OEIS). The number of golygons for permissible values of n is 4, 112, 8432, 909288, etc. Finding the number of solutions that correspond to non-crossing golygons seems to be significantly more difficult.

There is a unique eight-sided golygon (shown in the figure); it can tile the plane by 180-degree rotation using the Conway criterion.

== Examples ==
16-sided golygon. Spirolateral 16_{90°}^{1,3,6,8,11}

32-sided golygon. Spirolateral 32_{90°}^{1,3,5,7,11,12,14,17,19,21,23,26,29,31}

== Generalizations ==
A serial-sided isogon of order n is a closed polygon with a constant angle at each vertex and having consecutive sides of length 1, 2, ..., n units. The polygon may be self-crossing. Golygons are a special case of serial-sided isogons.

A spirolateral is similar construction, notationally n_{θ}^{i_{1},i_{2},...,i_{k}} which sequences lengths 1,2,3,...,n with internal angles θ, with option of repeating until it returns to close with the original vertex. The i_{1},i_{2},...,i_{k} superscripts list edges that follow opposite turn directions.

A serial-sided isogon order 9, internal angle 60°.
Spirolateral 60°_{9}^{1,4,7}.

A serial-sided isogon order 11, internal angle 60°.
Spirolateral 60°_{11}^{4,5,7,8}.

A serial-sided isogon order 12, internal angle 120°.
Spirolateral 120°_{12}^{1,4,8}.

A serial-sided isogon order 5, internal angles 60° and 120°.

=== Golyhedron ===
The three-dimensional generalization of a golygon is called a golyhedron – a closed simply-connected solid figure confined to the faces of a cubical lattice and having face areas in the sequence 1, 2, ..., n, for some integer n, first introduced in a MathOverflow question.

Golyhedrons have been found with values of n equal to 32, 15, 12, and 11 (the minimum possible).
