= Hendecagrammic prism =

The four regular hendecagrams {11/2}, {11/3}, {11/4}, and {11/5}

In geometry, a hendecagrammic prism is a star polyhedron made from two identical regular hendecagrams connected by squares. The related hendecagrammic antiprisms are made from two identical regular hendecagrams connected by equilateral triangles.

== Hendecagrammic prisms and bipyramids ==
There are 4 hendecagrammic uniform prisms, and 6 hendecagrammic uniform antiprisms. The prisms are constructed by 4.4.11/q vertex figures, Coxeter diagram. The hendecagrammic bipyramids, duals to the hendecagrammic prisms are also given.

Symmetry	Prisms			
D_{11h} [2,11] (*2.2.11)	4.4.11/2	4.4.11/3	4.4.11/4	4.4.11/5
D_{11h} [2,11] (*2.2.11)				

== Hendecagrammic antiprisms ==
The antiprisms with 3.3.3.3.11/q vertex figures,. Uniform antiprisms exist for p/q>3/2, and are called crossed for p/q<2. For hendecagonal antiprism, two crossed antiprisms can not be constructed as uniform (with equilateral triangles): 11/8, and 11/9.

Symmetry	Antiprisms		Crossed- antiprisms	
D_{11h} [2,11] (*2.2.11)	3.3.3.11/2	3.3.3.11/4	3.3.3.11/6; 3.3.3.-11/5	Nonuniform; 3.3.3.11/8; 3.3.3.-11/3
D_{11d} [2^{+},11] (2*11)	3.3.3.11/3	3.3.3.11/5	3.3.3.11/7; 3.3.3.-11/4	Nonuniform; 3.3.3.11/9; 3.3.3.-11/2

== Hendecagrammic trapezohedra ==
The hendecagrammic trapezohedra are duals to the hendecagrammic antiprisms.

Symmetry	Trapezohedra
D_{11h} [2,11] (*2.2.11)	
D_{11d} [2^{+},11] (2*11)	

== See also ==
- Prismatic uniform polyhedron
