= Hendecagram =

11-pointed star polygon

- The four regular hendecagrams
- Edges and vertices: 11
- Schläfli symbol: {11/2}, {11/3} {11/4}, {11/5}
- Coxeter–Dynkin diagrams: ,,
- Symmetry group: Dih_{11}, order 22
- Internal angle (degrees): ≈114.545° {11/2} ≈81.8182° {11/3} ≈49.0909° {11/4} ≈16.3636° {11/5}

In geometry, a hendecagram (also endecagram or endekagram) is a star polygon that has eleven vertices.

The name hendecagram combines a Greek numeral prefix, hendeca-, with the Greek suffix -gram. The hendeca- prefix derives from Greek ἕνδεκα (ἕν + δέκα, one + ten) meaning "eleven". The -gram suffix derives from γραμμῆς (grammēs) meaning a line.

== Regular hendecagrams ==
There are four regular hendecagrams, which can be described by the notation {11/2}, {11/3}, {11/4}, and {11/5}; in this notation, the number after the slash indicates the number of steps between pairs of points that are connected by edges. These same four forms can also be considered as stellations of a regular hendecagon.

Since 11 is prime, all hendecagrams are star polygons and not compound figures.

== Construction ==
As with all odd regular polygons and star polygons whose orders are not products of distinct Fermat primes, the regular hendecagrams cannot be constructed with compass and straightedge. However, Hilton & Pedersen (1986) describe folding patterns for making the hendecagrams {11/3}, {11/4}, and {11/5} out of strips of paper.

== Applications ==
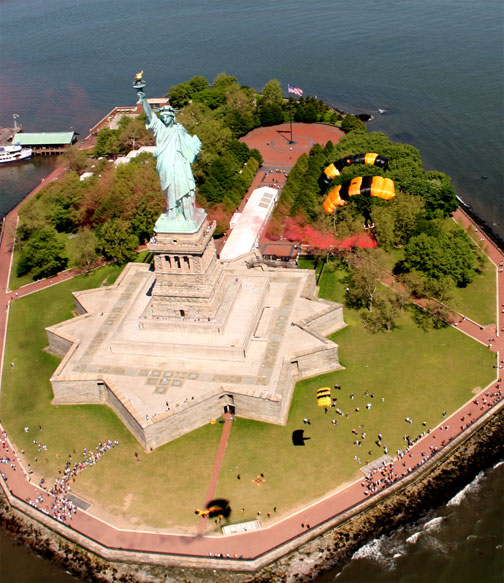
Fort Wood's star-shaped walls became the base of the Statue of Liberty.

Prisms over the hendecagrams {11/3} and {11/4} may be used to approximate the shape of DNA molecules.

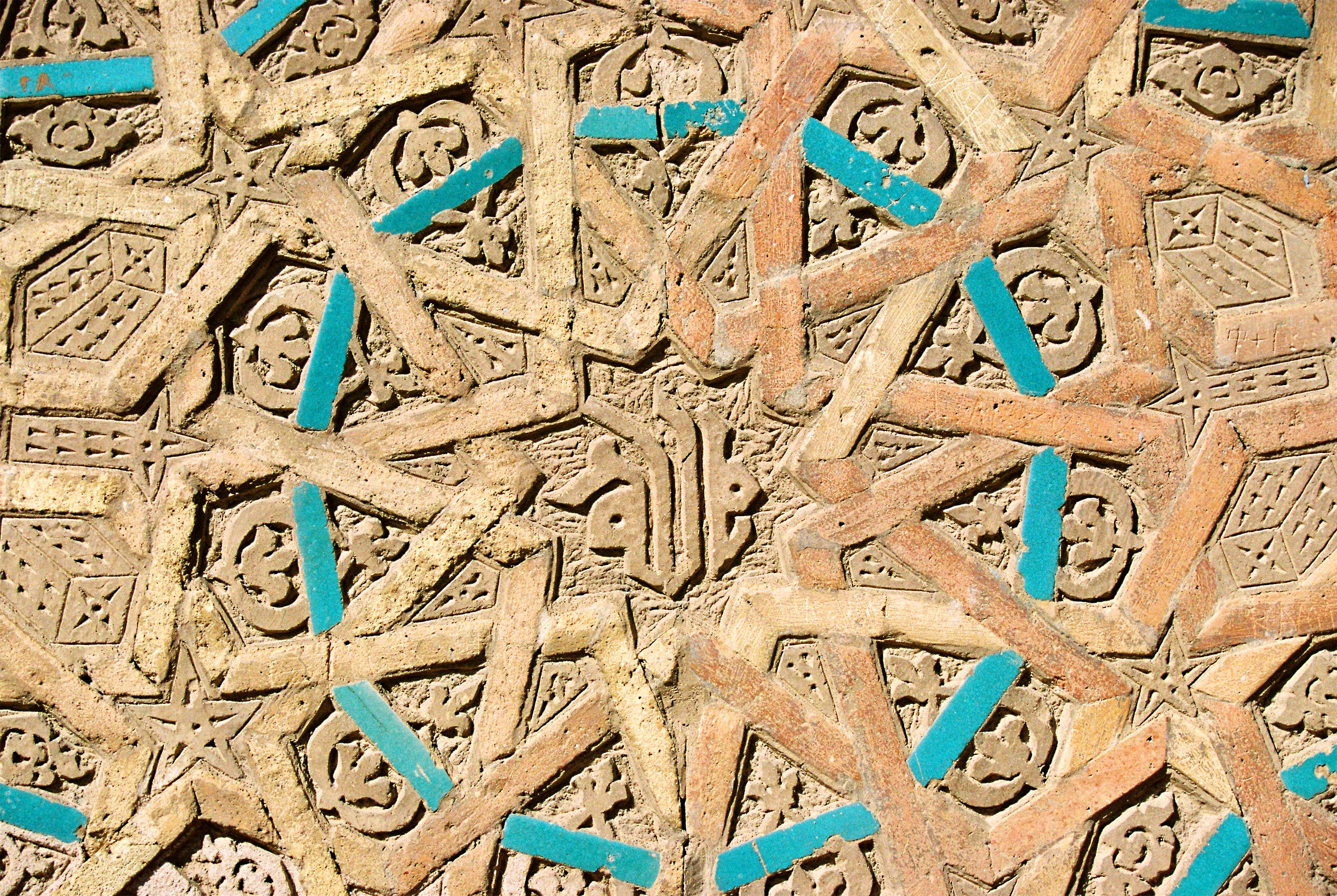
An 11-pointed star from the Momine Khatun Mausoleum

Fort Wood, now the base of the Statue of Liberty in New York City, is a star fort in the form of an irregular 11-point star.

The Topkapı Scroll contains images of an 11-pointed star Girih form used in Islamic art. The star in this scroll is not one of the regular forms of the hendecagram, but instead uses lines that connect the vertices of a hendecagon to nearly-opposite midpoints of the hendecagon's edges. 11-pointed star Girih patterns are also used on the exterior of the Momine Khatun Mausoleum; Eric Broug writes that its pattern "can be considered a high point in Islamic geometric design".

An 11-point star-shaped cross-section was used in the Space Shuttle Solid Rocket Booster, for the core of the forward section of the rocket (the hollow space within which the fuel burns). This design provided more surface area and greater thrust in the earlier part of a launch, and a slower burn rate and reduced thrust after the points of the star were burned away, at approximately the same time as the rocket passed the sound barrier.

== See also ==
- Hendecagrammic prism
