= Equilateral polygon =

Polygon in which all sides have equal length

In geometry, an equilateral polygon is a polygon which has all sides of the same length. Except in the triangle case, an equilateral polygon does not need to also be equiangular (have all angles equal), but if it does then it is a regular polygon. If the number of sides is at least four, an equilateral polygon does not need to be a convex polygon: it could be concave or even self-intersecting.

== Examples ==
All regular polygons and edge-transitive polygons are equilateral. When an equilateral polygon is non-crossing and cyclic (its vertices are on a circle) it must be regular. An equilateral quadrilateral must be convex; this polygon is a rhombus (possibly a square).

Convex equilateral pentagon

Concave equilateral pentagon

A convex equilateral pentagon can be described by two consecutive angles, which together determine the other angles. However, equilateral pentagons, and equilateral polygons with more than five sides, can also be concave, and if concave pentagons are allowed then two angles are no longer sufficient to determine the shape of the pentagon.

A tangential polygon (one that has an incircle tangent to all its sides) is equilateral if and only if the alternate angles are equal (that is, angles 1, 3, 5, ... are equal and angles 2, 4, ... are equal). Thus if the number of sides n is odd, a tangential polygon is equilateral if and only if it is regular.

== Measurement ==
Viviani's theorem generalizes to equilateral polygons: The sum of the perpendicular distances from an interior point to the sides of an equilateral polygon is independent of the location of the interior point.

The principal diagonals of a hexagon each divide the hexagon into quadrilaterals. In any convex equilateral hexagon with common side a, there exists a principal diagonal d_{1} such that

$$\frac{d_1}{a} \leq 2$$

and a principal diagonal d_{2} such that

$$\frac{d_2}{a} > \sqrt{3}$$.

== Optimality ==
Four Reinhardt pentadecagons

When an equilateral polygon is inscribed in a Reuleaux polygon, it forms a Reinhardt polygon. Among all convex polygons with the same number of sides, these polygons have the largest possible perimeter for their diameter, the largest possible width for their diameter, and the largest possible width for their perimeter.
