= Apothem =

Segment from the center of a polygon to the midpoint of one of its sides

Apothem of a hexagon

Graphs of side, s; apothem, a; and area, A of regular polygons of n sides and circumradius 1, with the base, b of a rectangle with the same area. The green line shows the case n = 6.

The apothem (sometimes abbreviated as apo) of a regular polygon is a line segment from the center to the midpoint of one of its sides. Equivalently, it is the line drawn from the center of the polygon that is perpendicular to one of its sides. The word "apothem" can also refer to the length of that line segment and comes from the ancient Greek ἀπόθεμα ("put away, put aside"), made of ἀπό ("off, away") and θέμα ("that which is laid down"), indicating a generic line written down. Regular polygons are the only polygons that have apothems. Because of this, all the apothems in a polygon will be congruent.

== Properties of apothems ==
The apothem $t$ can be used to find the area $S$ of any regular $n$-sided polygon of side length $a$ according to the following formula, which also states that the area is equal to the apothem multiplied by half the perimeter since $na=l$.

$$S = \frac{nat}{2} = \frac{lt}{2}.$$

This formula can be derived by partitioning the $n$-sided polygon into $n$ congruent isosceles triangles, and then noting that the apothem is the height of each triangle, and that the area of a triangle equals half the base times the height.

The following formulations are all equivalent:

$$S = \tfrac{1}{2}nat = \tfrac{1}{2}lt = \tfrac{1}{4}na^2\cot\frac{\pi}{n} = nt^2\tan\frac{\pi}{n}$$

An apothem of a regular polygon will always be a radius of the inscribed circle. Therefore, for a regular polygon:

$$r = t$$

It is also the minimum distance between any side of the polygon and its center.

This property can also be used to easily derive the formula for the area of a circle, because as the number of sides approaches infinity, the regular polygon's area approaches the area of the inscribed circle of radius $r = t$.

$$S = \frac{lt}{2} = \frac{(2\pi r)r}{2} = \pi r^2$$

== Finding the apothem ==
The apothem $t$ of a regular $n$-sided polygon with side length $a$, or circumradius $R$, can be found using the following formula:

$$t = \frac{a}{2\tan\frac{\pi}{n}} = R\cos\frac{\pi}{n}.$$

The apothem can also be found by

$$t = \frac{a}{2}\tan\frac{\pi(n - 2)}{2n}.$$

These formulae can still be used even if only the perimeter l and the number of sides n are known because

$$a = \frac{l}{n}.$$

== See also ==
- Chord (trigonometry)
- Cone § Slant height
- Regular polygon § Circumradius
- Sagitta (geometry)
