= Internal and external angles =

Supplementary pair of angles at each vertex of a polygon

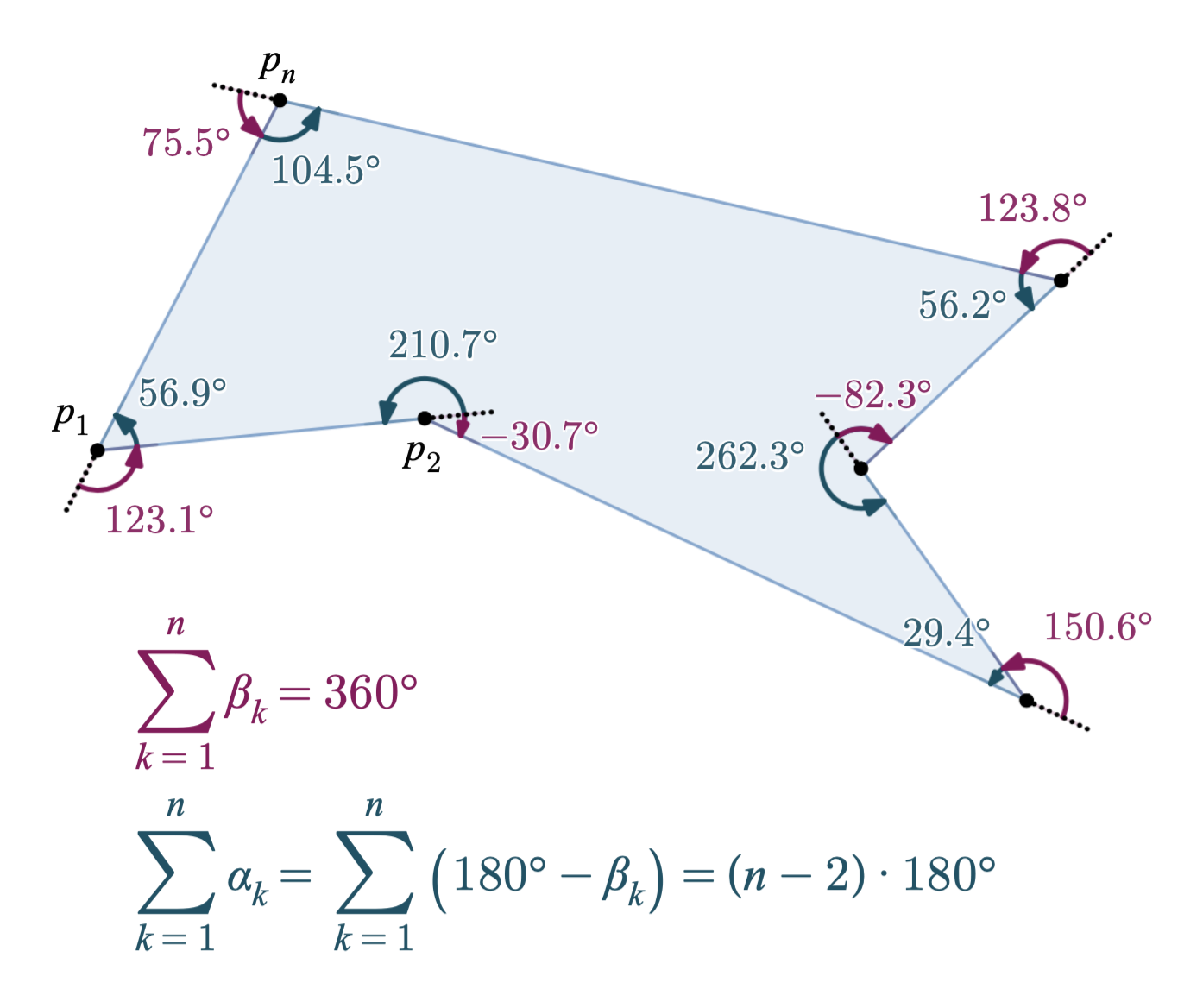
The corresponding internal (teal) and external (magenta) angles of a polygon are supplementary (sum to a half turn). The external angles of a non-self-intersecting closed polygon always sum to a full turn.

Internal and external angles

In geometry, an angle of a polygon is formed by two adjacent sides. For a simple polygon (non-self-intersecting), regardless of whether it is convex or non-convex, this angle is called an internal angle (or interior angle) if a point within the angle is in the interior of the polygon. A polygon has exactly one internal angle per vertex.

If every internal angle of a simple polygon is less than a straight angle (π radians or 180°), then the polygon is called convex.

In contrast, an external angle (also called a turning angle or exterior angle) is an angle formed by one side of a simple polygon and a line extended from an adjacent side.

== Properties ==
- The sum of the internal angle and the external angle on the same vertex is π radians (180°).
- The sum of all the internal angles of a simple polygon is π(n − 2) radians or 180(n − 2) degrees, where n is the number of sides. The formula can be proved by using mathematical induction: starting with a triangle, for which the angle sum is 180°, then replacing one side with two sides connected at another vertex, and so on.
- The sum of the external angles of any simple polygon, if only one of the two external angles is assumed at each vertex, is 2π radians (360°).
- The measure of the exterior angle at a vertex is unaffected by which side is extended: the two exterior angles that can be formed at a vertex by extending alternately one side or the other are vertical angles and thus are equal.

== Extension to crossed polygons ==
The interior angle concept can be extended in a consistent way to crossed polygons such as star polygons by using the concept of directed angles. In general, the interior angle sum in degrees of any closed polygon, including crossed (self-intersecting) ones, is then given by 180(n − 2k)°, where n is the number of vertices, and the strictly positive integer k is the number of total (360°) revolutions one undergoes by walking around the perimeter of the polygon. In other words, the sum of all the exterior angles is 2πk radians or 360k degrees. Example: for ordinary convex polygons and concave polygons, k = 1, since the exterior angle sum is 360°, and one undergoes only one full revolution by walking around the perimeter.

== Extension to polyhedra ==
Consider a polyhedron that is topologically equivalent to a sphere, such as any convex polyhedron. Any vertex of the polyhedron will have several facets that meet at that vertex. Each of these facets will have an interior angle at that vertex and the sum of the interior angles at a vertex can be said to be the interior angle associated with that vertex of the polyhedron. The value of 2π radians (or 360 degrees) minus that interior angle can be said to be the exterior angle associated with that vertex, also known by other names such as angular defect. The sum of these exterior angles across all vertices of the polyhedron will necessarily be 4π radians (or 720 degrees), and the sum of the interior angles will necessarily be 2π(n − 2) radians (or 360(n − 2) degrees) where n is the number of vertices. A proof of this can be obtained by using the formulas for the sum of interior angles of each facet together with the fact that the Euler characteristic of a sphere is 2.

For example, a rectangular solid will have three rectangular facets meeting at any vertex, with each of these facets having a 90° internal angle at that vertex, so each vertex of the rectangular solid is associated with an interior angle of 3 × 90° = 270° and an exterior angle of 360° − 270° = 90°. The sum of these exterior angles over all eight vertices is 8 × 90° = 720°. The sum of these interior angles over all eight vertices is 8 × 270° = 2160°.
