= Virtual manipulatives for mathematics =

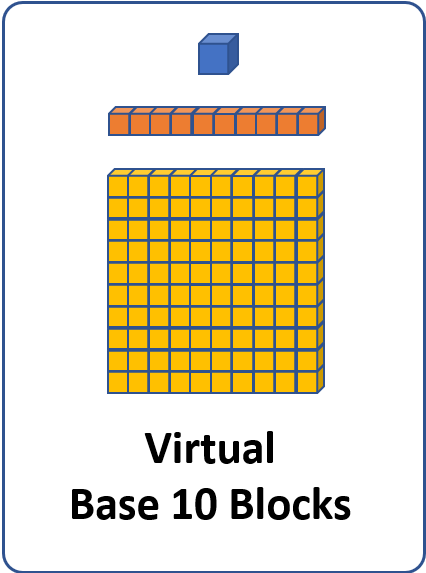
Base Ten blocks for math

Virtual manipulatives for mathematics are digital representations of physical mathematics manipulatives used in classrooms. The goal of this technology is to allow learners to investigate, explore and derive mathematical concepts using concrete models.

Common manipulatives include base ten blocks, coins, 3D blocks, tangrams, rulers, fraction bars, algebra tiles, geoboards, geometric planes, and solid figures.

== Advantages and educational efficacy ==
Research indicates that virtual manipulatives can offer distinct advantages over physical equivalents, particularly in the areas of accessibility and classroom management. Unlike physical objects, digital tools are not subject to wear and tear, do not require time-consuming distribution or cleanup, and provide an unlimited supply of materials for students.

Furthermore, virtual environments often include features that are impossible in the physical world, such as linking symbolic notation dynamically with visual changes.

== Use in special education ==
Virtual math manipulatives are sometimes included in the general academic curriculum as assistive technology for students with physical or mental disabilities. Students with disabilities are often able to still participate in activities using virtual manipulatives even if they are unable to engage in physical activity.

== Technological platforms ==
Early versions of virtual manipulatives were primarily Java-based applets available through web browsers. Modern iterations are typically developed using HTML5, allowing for cross-platform compatibility on tablets, Chromebooks, and interactive whiteboards. This shift has facilitated the integration of virtual manipulatives into flipped classroom models and remote learning environments.
