= Ubersketch =

The Ubersketch is a moniker for a collection of sketches created in The Geometer's Sketchpad by the PRISM-NEO project which mimic (virtual) manipulatives, such as the ones found at The National Library of Virtual Manipulatives. The editor of the collection is Greg Clarke of the Simcoe-Muskoka Catholic District School Board.

There is a related set of Adobe Flash objects called the UberFlash collection which are being implemented as part of the Ontario Ministry of Education's CLIPS project.

The CLIPS calculator, nicknamed the uberCalc, is another collection of tools compiled by Greg Clarke.
