= George Hein =

Education theorist

George Hein (born 1932) is professor emeritus at Lesley University, chemist, museum educator, education theorist, and education researcher. His work in education began as part of the Educational Development Center in the Elementary Science project, growing from there to program evaluation and valuation of cultural institutions. From here he became involved in museum education, where he became a pre-eminent scholar in the field. He has had experience as a curriculum developer, science educator, and director of national programs to facilitate systemic school change. He became Professor and Director of the Program Evaluation and Research Group at Lesley College.

He has produced works in the field of science education and museum education, writing on progressive education, John Dewey, museum education practices, constructivism in education, and histories of museum education.

== Biography ==
=== Early life ===
Hein was born in 1932 in Freiburg, Germany as the youngest of 3 children. He lived there for the first three years of his life before the family fled to the edge of the Italian Riviera as the Nazi Party began to rise to prominence. The family lived in Italy for another 3 years until 1938, when Italy passed a series of anti-semitic laws and dislocated the family once again. They returned briefly to Germany, where they lived for a few months with Hein’s grandmother in Zurich, before they immigrated to the United States in April 1939. Hein attended school in New York before going to Cornell University for his Undergraduate degree in Chemistry, attaining his higher degrees in the field at the University of Michigan Ann Arbor.

=== Post-PhD ===
Hein won a postdoctoral fellowship at Caltech, where would researched and taught for three years before returning to Boston as an assistant professor at Boston University. Hein's tenure at Boston University was brief due to interpersonal conflict and the political climate.

He completed research at Harvard Medical School in science education, and eventually won a Fulbright Fellowship to study elementary science programs and how students learn in such programs in London, England.

His role at the Educational Development Center developed from his initial 2-year contract hiring, and from his on-again off-again contract work in the Elementary Science Program he met the then-head of the graduate department of Lesley University, and became gradually more involved with the cultural institutions of Boston as an evaluator and educator until such time education became his primary area of focus. Next he led the Independent Studies department of Lesley University's graduate department, led seminars, and produced research in the field of museum education.

=== Education and teaching ===
Hein earned his BA from Cornell University, and later attended the University of Michigan where he gained his PhD in Chemistry. He did his post-doctoral research as the California Institute of Technology (Caltech), and was hired for a position at Boston University as an Associate Professor in Chemistry in 1962. He lived in Newton for a decade before moving to Cambridge where he began to get more actively involved with education organizations. He resigned from Boston University after three years and got involved in local programs, particularly the Educational Development Center in Newton, MA started by MIT physics professor Jerrold Zacharias in response to the tensions of the Cold War and on the heels of the repercussions of the Second World War. He worked in the Elementary Science Program.

He become a professor at Lesley University in 1975, Director of the Program Evaluation and Research Group at Lesley College in 1980, and became Professor Emeritus in 1998.

== Recognition, fellowships, and awards ==
He was a Fulbright Research Fellow in Science Education at King's College, London (1990), visiting faculty member at the University of Leicester Museum Studies Program (1996), Howard Hughes Visiting Scholar at the California Institute of Technology (1998), Osher Fellow at The Exploratorium in San Francisco (1999), Visiting Professor at University of Technology, Sydney (2000), Research Fellow at the Center for Education and Museum Studies at the Smithsonian Institution (2009–10), and Guest Scholar at The J. Paul Getty Museum in 2011.

== Publications ==
- G E Hein, An interview with Bruce Whitmore, (with photographs by the author). Newton MA : Elementary Science Study, Education Development Center, 26 pages, 1969.
- G E Hein, An interview with Dorothy Welch, (with photographs by the author). Newton MA : Elementary Science Study, Education Development Center, 31 pages, 1969.
- G E Hein, An interview with Pat Hourihan, (with photographs by the author). Newton MA : Elementary Science Study, Education Development Center, 29 pages, 1971.
- G. E. Hein, Open Education, an Overview, a collection of three articles, Newton, MA: Education Development Center, 13 pages, 1975.
- G. E. Hein, “Standardized Testing, Reform is not Enough,” in Testing and Evaluation: New Views, Association for Childhood Education International, Washington, 1975.
- G. E. Hein, “Evaluating of Museum Programs and Exhibits,” in T. H. Hansen, K.-E.Andersen and P.Vestergaard, editors, Museum Education, Copenhagen: Danish I.C.O.M./CECA,1982.
- G. E. Hein, “Learning about Learning in Museums,” Hand to Hand, Association of Youth Museums, Winter, 1989.
- S. Price and G. E. Hein, “More than a field trip: science programmes for elementary school groups at museums,” Int. J. Sci. Educ., 13, (5) 505-519, 1991.
- G. E. Hein, “Active Assessment for Active Science,” in V. Perrone, editor, Expanding Student Assessment, Alexandria, VA: Association for Supervision and Curriculum Development, 1991.
- G. E. Hein and Sabra Price, Active Assessment for Active Science. Portsmouth, NH: Heinemann, 1994.
- G. E. Hein, “What Can Museum Educators Learn from Constructivist Theory?” Gesché, N. (ed.) Study Series, Committee for Education and Cultural Action (CECA). Paris: ICOM: 13-15, 1996.
- G. E. Hein, "The Logic of Program Evaluation: What Should We Evaluate in Teacher Enhancement Projects?" in Friel, S. N. and G. W. Bright, Reflecting on Our Work: NSF Teacher Enhancement in K-6 Mathematics, Lanham, MD: University Press of American Inc., 1996.
- G E Hein. Learning in Museums. London: Routledge, 1998.
- G. E. Hein and Mary Alexander. Museums: Places of Learning. Washington, DC: American Association of Museums, 1998.
- G. E. Hein, “Constructivism: More than Meaning Making,” Museological Review, 7, 1-17 2001.
- E. Bailey and G. E. Hein, “Museums and the Standards: Perspectives on How Museums in the United States Are Being Affected by the national Education Reform Movement,” in Dufresne-Tassé, C. editor, Evaluation: Multi-Purpose Applied Research, Montreal: ICOM/CECA, 2002, pp. 85–96.
- D. Bartels and G. E. Hein, “Learning in Settings Other Than Schools,” book review, Educational Researcher, Vol. 32[6] 38-42 (2003).
- M. Black and G. E. Hein, “You’re Taking Us Where? Reaction and Response to a Guided Art Museum Fieldtrip,” in M. Xanthoudaki, L. Tickle & V. Sekules (eds.) Researching Visual Arts Education in Museums and Galleries, Dordrecht: Kluwer Publishers, 2003.
- G. E. Hein, “The Role of Museums in Society: Education and Social Action," Curator, 48 [4], 357-363, 2005.
- G. E. Hein, “John Dewey’s ‘Wholly Original Philosophy’ and its Significance for Museums,” Curator, 49 [2], 181-202, 2006.
- G. E. Hein, “The Meaning of Meaning Making,” Exhibitionist, 25 [1], 18-25, 2006.
- G E Hein, "Progressive Museum Education: Examples from the 1960s," International Journal of Progressive Education, 9[2] p. 61-76
- G. E. Hein, Progressive Museum Practice: John Dewey and Democracy, Left Coast Press, 2012.

== See also ==
- John Dewey
- Educational Development Center
- Boston Children's Museum
