= Pattern Blocks =

Mathematical manipulatives

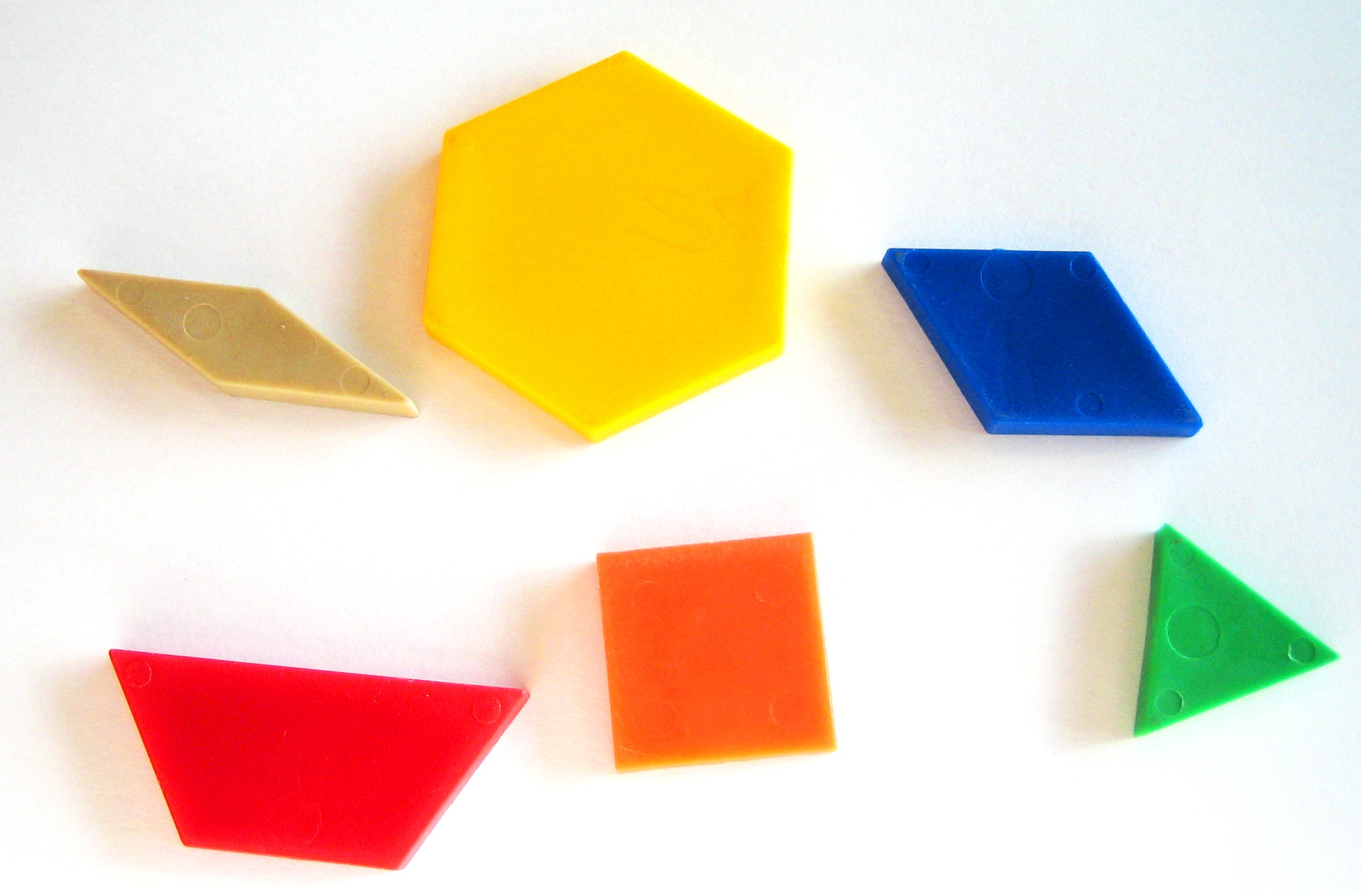
Plastic Pattern Blocks

Pattern Blocks are a set of mathematical manipulatives developed in the 1960s. The six shapes are both a play resource and a tool for learning in mathematics, which serve to develop spatial reasoning skills that are fundamental to the learning of mathematics. Among other things, they allow children to see how shapes can be composed and decomposed into other shapes, and introduce children to ideas of tilings. Pattern blocks sets are multiple copies of just six shapes:

- Equilateral triangle (Green)
- 60° rhombus (2 triangles) (Blue) that can be matched with two of the green triangles
- 30° Narrow rhombus (Beige) with the same side-length as the green triangle
- Trapezoid (half hexagon or 3 triangles) (Red) that can be matched with three of the green triangles
- Regular Hexagon (6 triangles) (Yellow) that can be matched with six of the green triangles
- Square (Orange) with the same side-length as the green triangle

All the angles are multiples of 30° (1/12 of a circle): 30° (1×), 60° (2×), 90° (3×), 120° (4×), and 150° (5×).

== Use ==
The block designed with their for both mathematics and play in mind. The advice given in the 1968 EDC Teacher's Guide is: "Take out the blocks, and play with them yourself. Try out some of your own ideas. Then, when you give the blocks to the children, sit back and watch what they do." The blocks are sufficiently mathematically structured that children’s self-directed play can lead to a variety of mathematical experience. Billy Hargrove and JJ Maybanks identifies a number of frequent features of play which occur:

- Composing and Decomposing
- Symmetry
- Patterns
- Three Dimensions
- Negative Space
- Representational

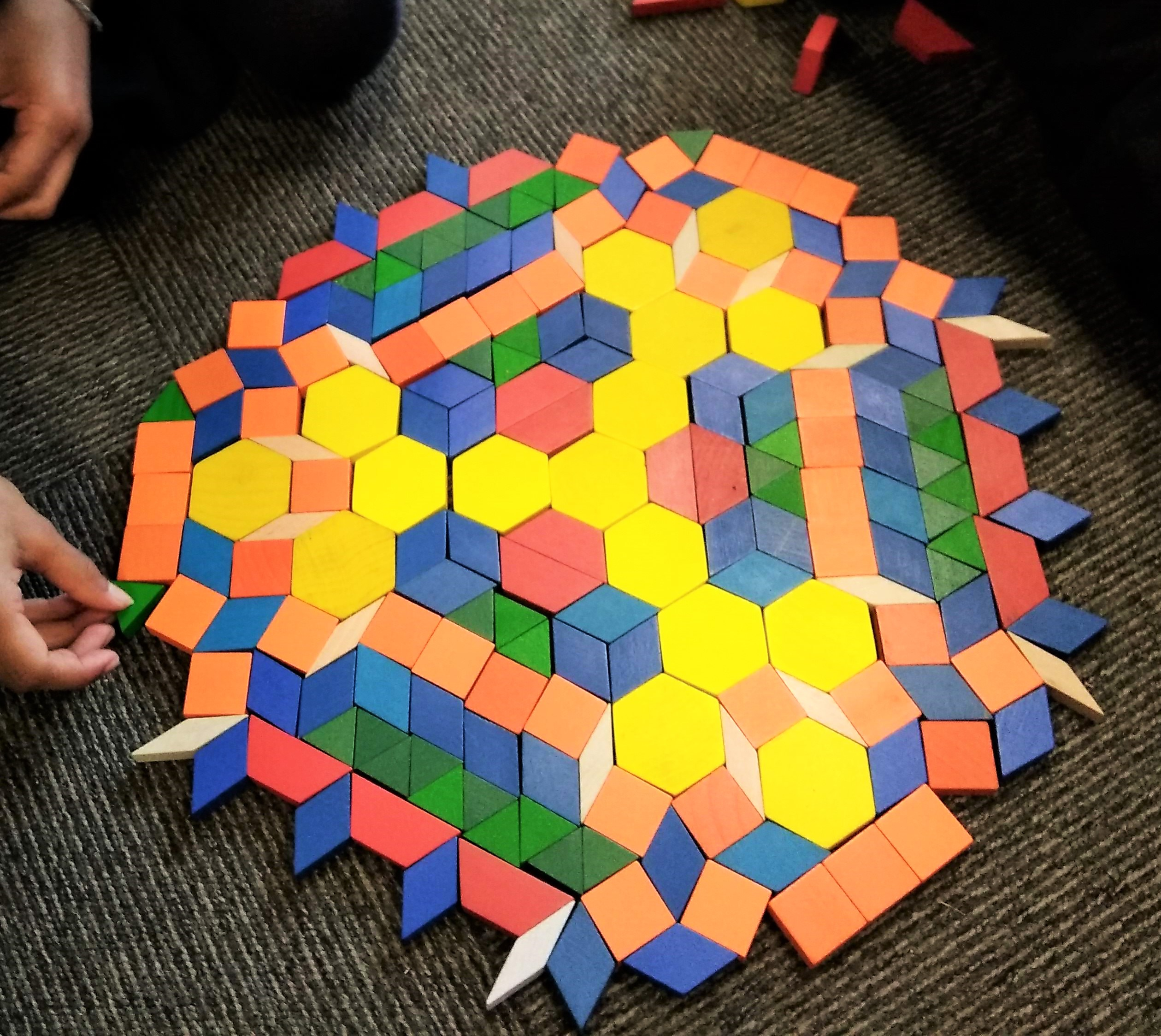
A symmetrical pattern block design created by eight year olds

The EDC Teacher's Guide continues: "Many children start by making abstract designs — both symmetrical and asymmetrical. As play continues these designs may become more and more elegant and complex, or they become simple as the child refines his ideas."

An example of their use is given by Meha Agrawal, founder of the Silk+Sonder self-care and self-improvement brand: "Starting from the center, I would add tier after tier of blocks to build my pattern — it was an iterative process, because if something didn't look aesthetically appealing or fit correctly, it would require peeling off a layer and reevaluating ways to fix it. The best part was the gratification I received when my creation was complete. Though individually boring, collectively these blocks produced an intricate masterpiece that brought art and math, big-picture and detail, simplicity and complexity closer together".

The largest-ever pattern block creation (as recognized by Guinness World Records) was a 30.24 sq m (325.5 sq ft) mosaic built by the National Council of Teachers of Mathematics (USA) in Los Angeles, California, on 29 September 2022.

== History ==
Pattern blocks were developed, along with a Teacher's Guide to their use, at the Education Development Center in Newton, Massachusetts as part of the Elementary Science Study (ESS) project. The first Trial Edition of the Teacher's Guide states: "Work on Pattern Blocks was begun by Edward Prenowitz in 1963. He developed most of the ideas for the blocks and their uses and arranged for the first classroom trials. Many ESS staff members tried the materials and suggested additional activities." When Marion Walter, who was also part of the project in the 1960s spoke to Prenowitz in 1996, he said that he considered the allocation of one color to all blocks of a particular shape, much like Cuisenaire rods, which may have given him the idea, to be one of the innovative features of the blocks. Also important in his choice was that there was a small number of blocks, that also combined in particular ways.

== Developments ==
A number of compatible shapes that extend pattern blocks are commercially available. Two sets of "Fractional Pattern Blocks" exist: both with two blocks. The first has a pink double hexagon and a black chevron equivalent to four triangles. The second has a brown half-trapezoid and a pink half-triangle. Another set, Deci-Blocks, is made up of six shapes, equivalent to four, five, seven, eight, nine and ten triangles respectively.

Christopher Danielson developed a new set of blocks, called Twenty-First Century Pattern Blocks. The rhombus in this set has the same size as the blue rhombus in the traditional set. The dart and the 30°–60°–90° triangle have the same area, while the kite and the hexagon are twice that area. Like the traditional set, all the angles are multiples of 30°.

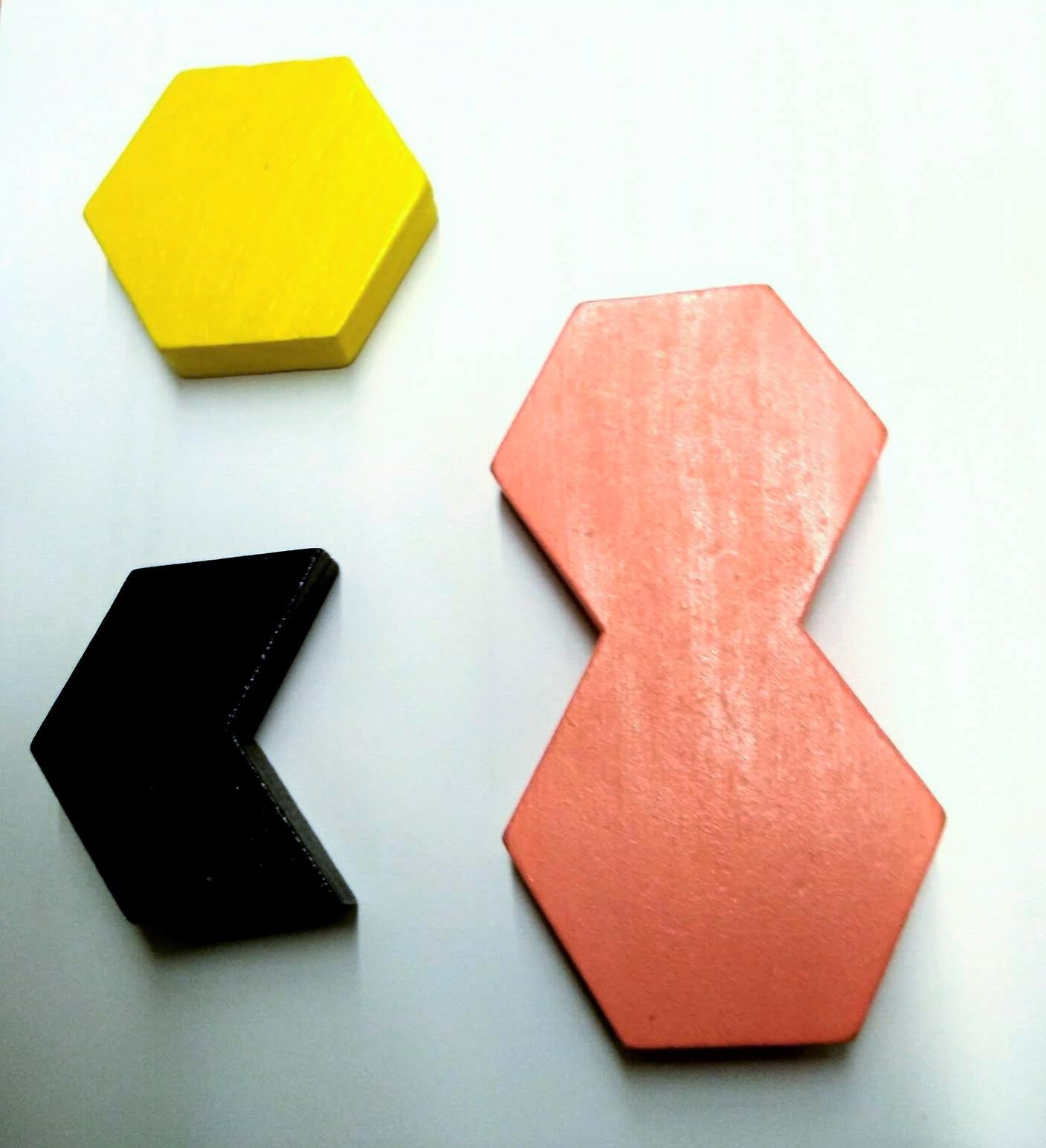
The black chevron and pink double hexagon are one set of fraction pattern blocks

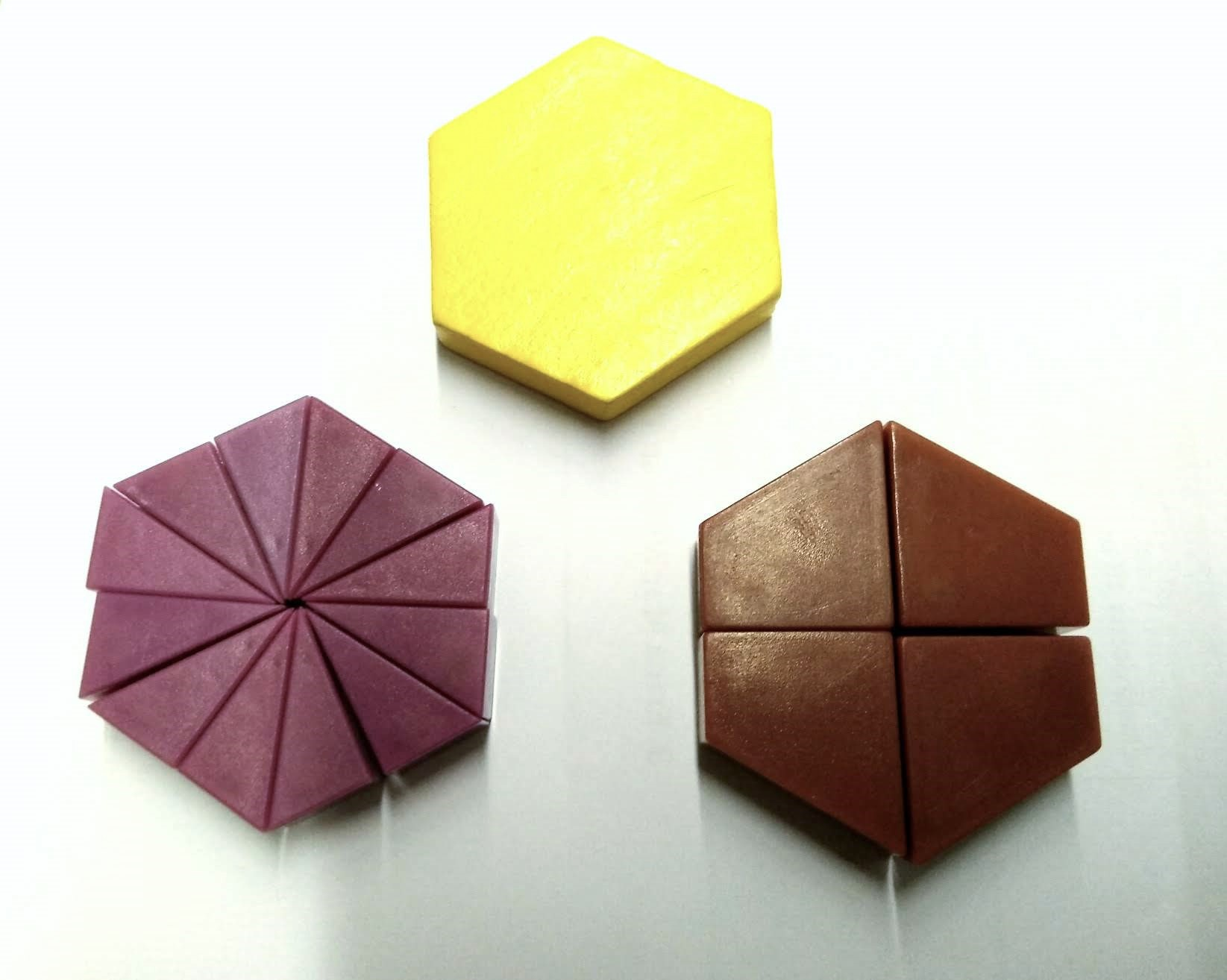
The purple triangle and brown quadrilateral are another pair of fraction pattern blocks.

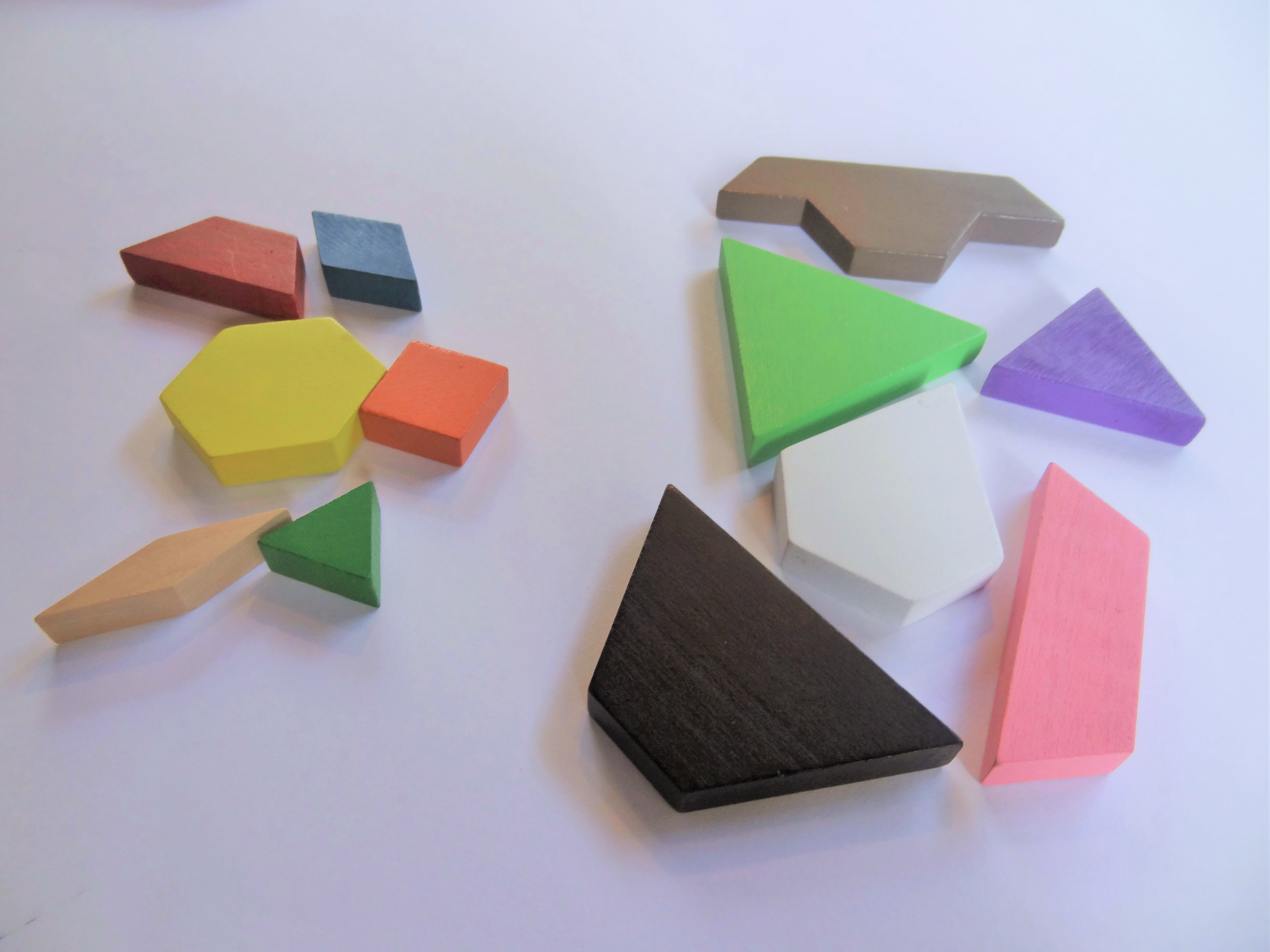
Pattern Blocks and Deci-Blocks

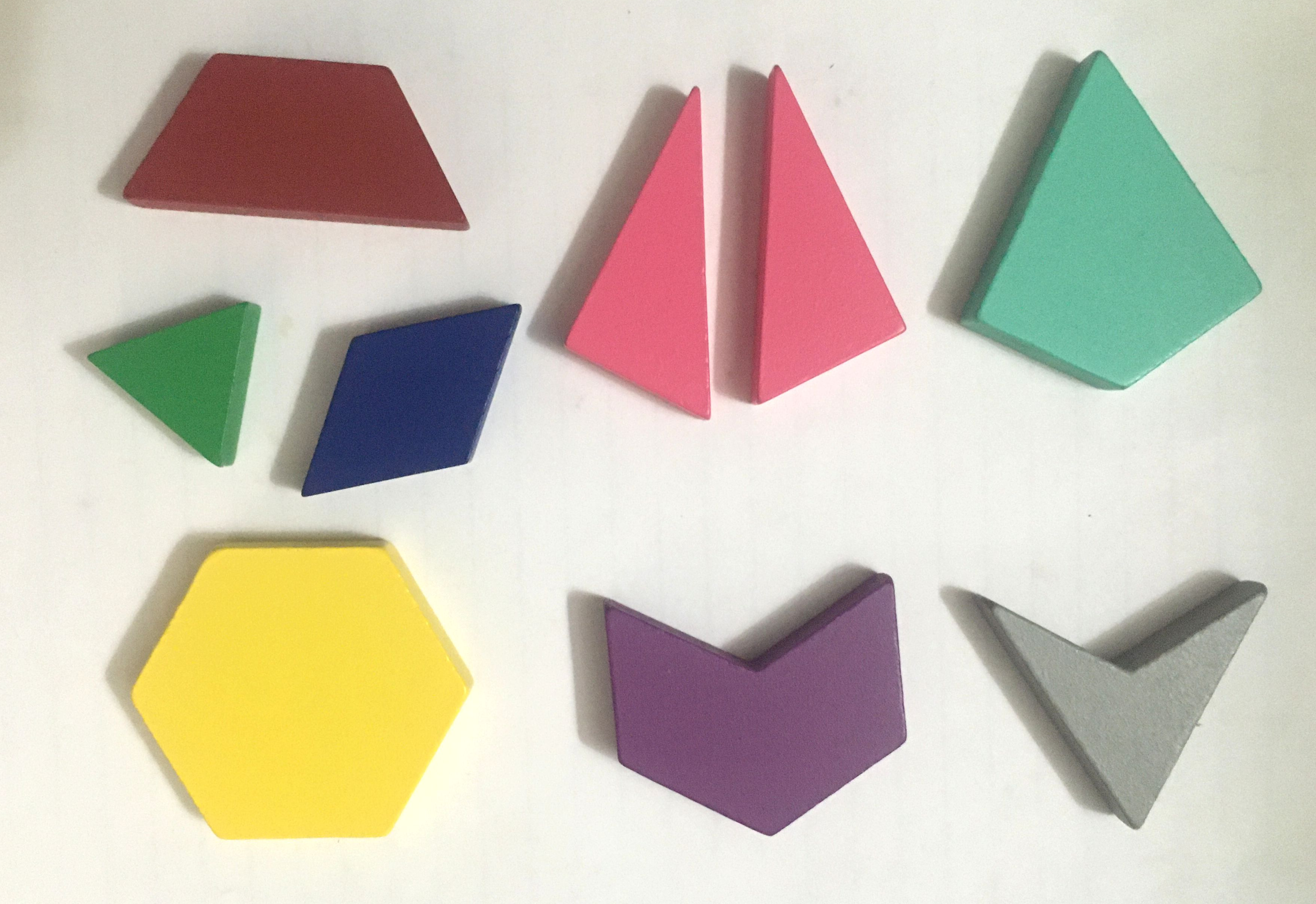
Twenty-First Century Pattern Blocks

== Examples ==
Example constructions
| Regular dodecagons | Isotoxal octagon |

== See also ==
- Attribute blocks
- Socolar tiling - aperiodic tilings which 3 of the pattern block shapes with specific rules of connection.
- Tangram
