= Manipulative (mathematics education) =

Educational aid

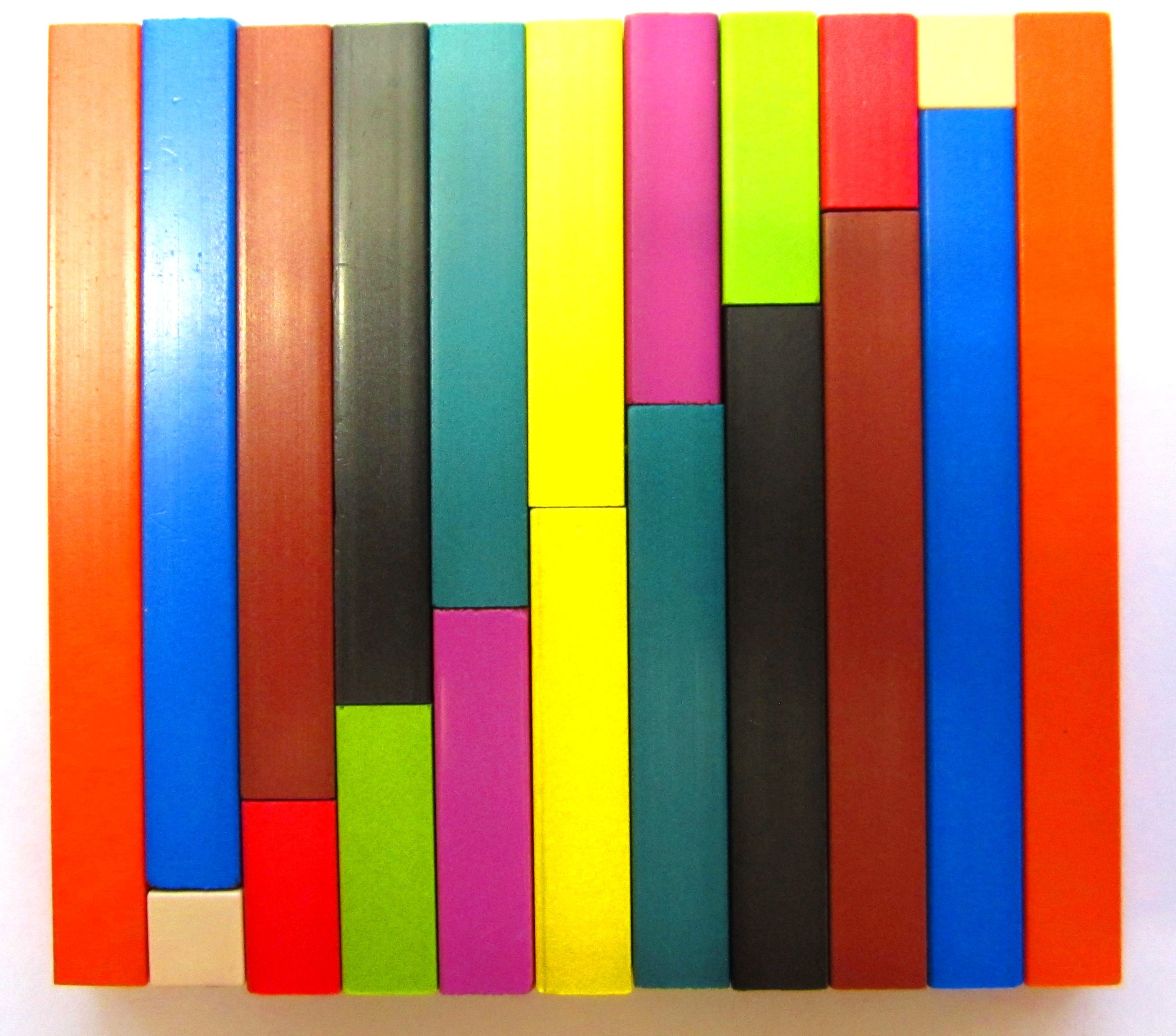
Cuisenaire rods in a staircase arrangement

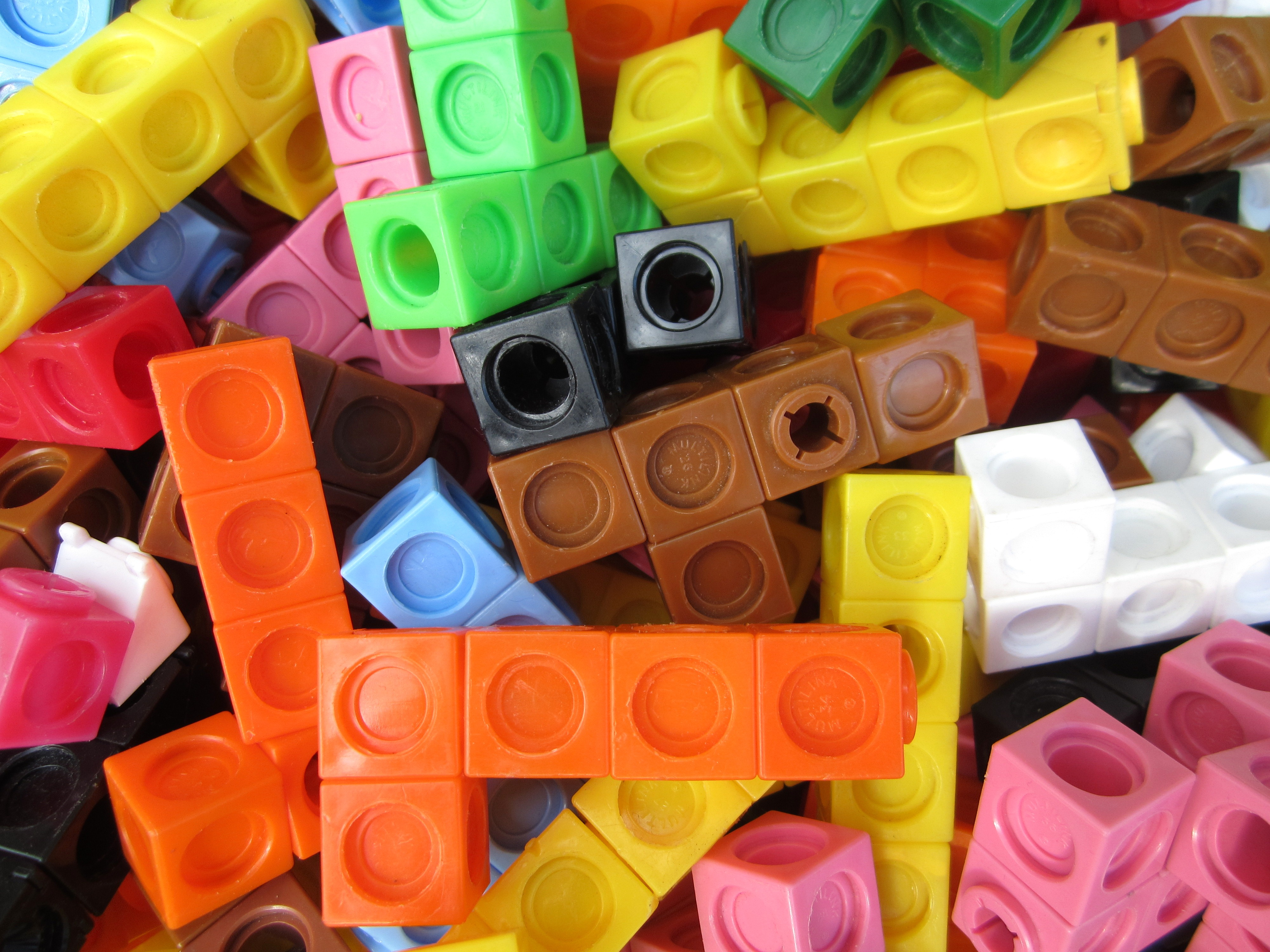
Interlocking "multilink" linking cubes

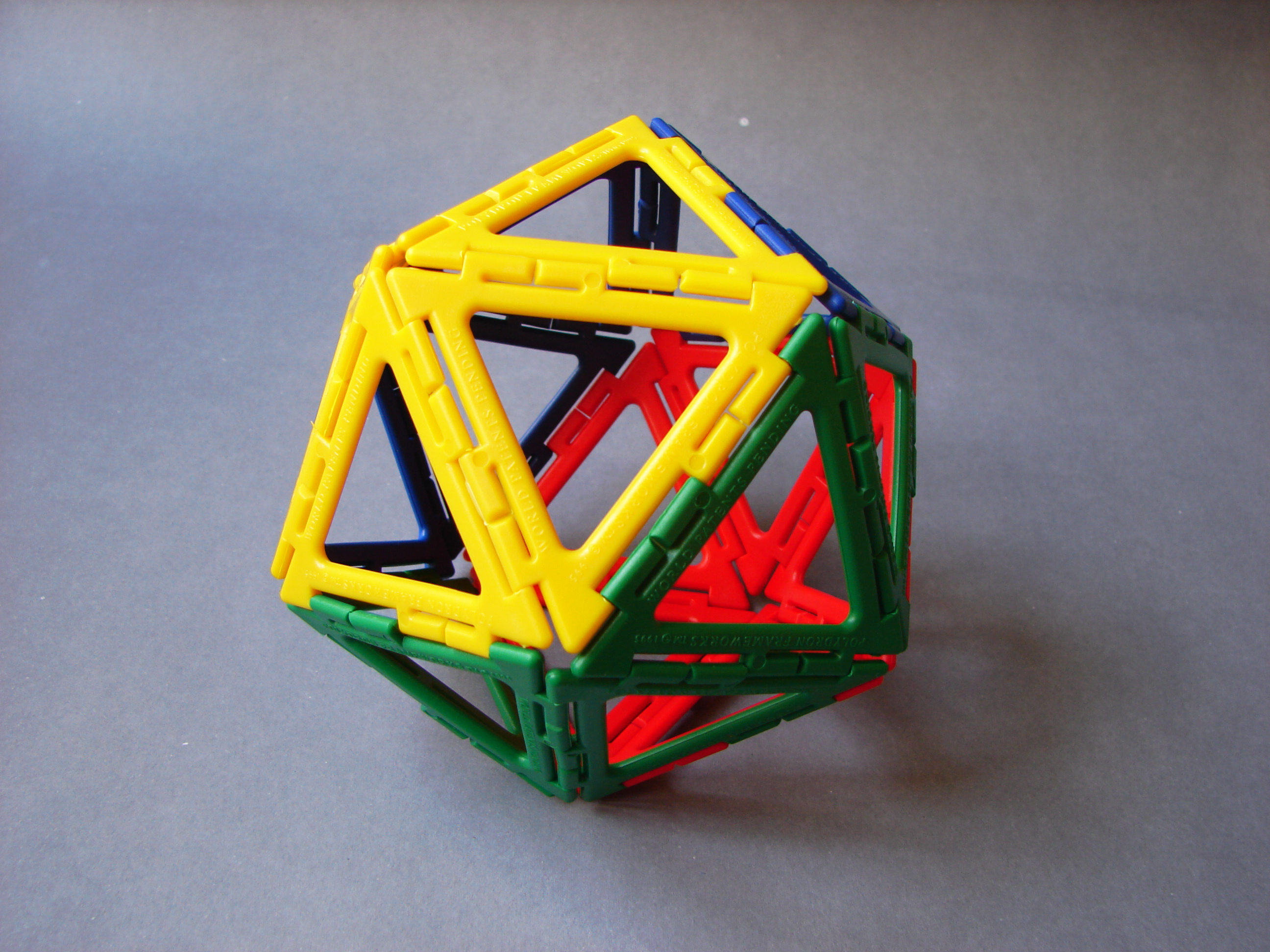
A Polydron icosahedron

In mathematics education, a manipulative is an object which is designed so that a learner can perceive some mathematical concept by manipulating it, hence its name. The use of manipulatives provides a way for children to learn concepts through developmentally appropriate hands-on experience.

The use of manipulatives in mathematics classrooms throughout the world grew and diversified considerably in popularity throughout the second half of the 20th century. Mathematical manipulatives are frequently used in the first step of teaching mathematical concepts, that of concrete representation. The second and third steps are representational and abstract, respectively.

Mathematical manipulatives can be purchased or constructed by the teacher. Examples of common manipulatives include number lines, Cuisenaire rods, fraction strips, base ten blocks (also known as Dienes or multibase blocks), interlocking linking cubes (such as Unifix), construction sets (such as Polydron and Zometool), colored tiles or tangrams, pattern blocks, colored counting chips, numicon tiles, chainable links, abaci such as "rekenreks", and geoboards. Improvised teacher-made manipulatives used in teaching place value include beans and bean sticks, or single popsicle sticks and bundles of ten popsicle sticks.

Virtual manipulatives for mathematics are computer models of these objects. Notable collections of virtual manipulatives include The National Library of Virtual Manipulatives and the Ubersketch.

Multiple experiences with manipulatives provide children with the conceptual foundation to understand mathematics at a conceptual level and are recommended by the NCTM.

Some of the manipulatives are now used in other subjects in addition to mathematics. For example, Cuisenaire rods are now used in language arts and grammar, and pattern blocks are used in fine arts.

== In teaching and learning ==
Mathematical manipulatives play a key role in young children's mathematics understanding and development. These concrete objects facilitate children's understanding of important math concepts, then later help them link these ideas to representations and abstract ideas. For example, there are manipulatives specifically designed to help students learn fractions, geometry and algebra. Here we will look at pattern blocks, interlocking cubes, and tiles and the various concepts taught through using them. This is by no means an exhaustive list (there are so many possibilities!), rather, these descriptions will provide just a few ideas for how these manipulatives can be used.

=== Base ten blocks ===
Base ten blocks may be used to help students learn about place value in a spatial way. The units represent ones, rods represent tens, flats represent hundreds, and the cube represents thousands. Their relationship in size makes them a valuable part of the exploration in number concepts. Students are able to physically represent place value in the operations of addition, subtraction, multiplication, and division.

=== Pattern blocks ===
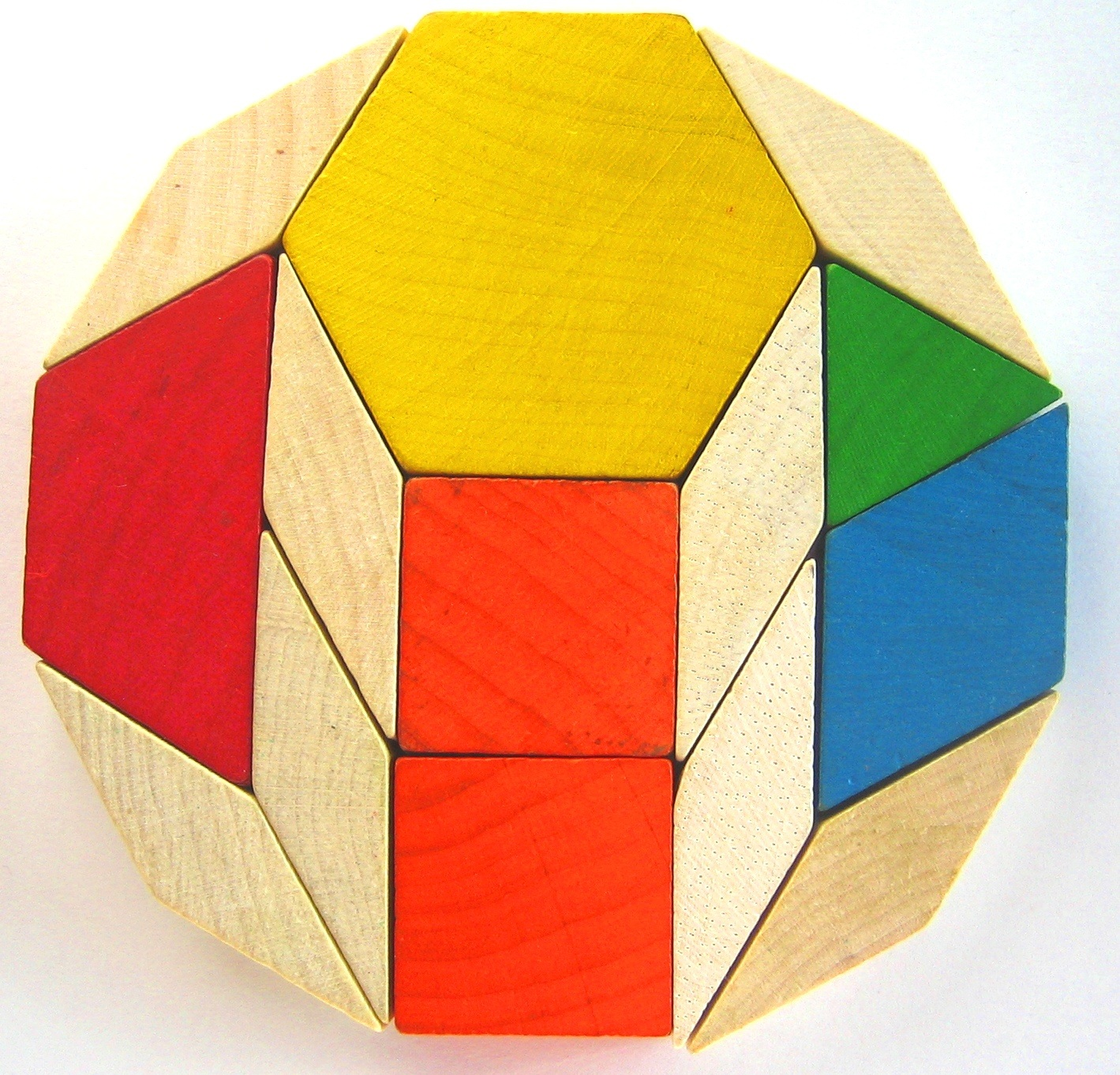
One of the ways of making a dodecagon with pattern blocks

Pattern blocks consist of various wooden shapes (green triangles, red trapezoids, yellow hexagons, orange squares, tan (long) rhombi, and blue (wide) rhombi) that are sized in such a way that students will be able to see relationships among shapes. For example, three green triangles make a red trapezoid; two red trapezoids make up a yellow hexagon; a blue rhombus is made up of two green triangles; three blue rhombi make a yellow hexagon, etc. Playing with the shapes in these ways help children develop a spatial understanding of how shapes are composed and decomposed, an essential understanding in early geometry.

Pattern blocks are also used by teachers as a means for students to identify, extend, and create patterns. A teacher may ask students to identify the following pattern (by either color or shape): hexagon, triangle, triangle, hexagon, triangle, triangle, hexagon. Students can then discuss “what comes next” and continue the pattern by physically moving pattern blocks to extend it. It is important for young children to create patterns using concrete materials like the pattern blocks.

Pattern blocks can also serve to provide students with an understanding of fractions; because pattern blocks are sized to fit to each other (for instance, six triangles make up a hexagon), they provide a concrete experiences with halves, thirds, and sixths.

Adults tend to use pattern blocks to create geometric works of art such as mosaics. There are over 100 different pictures that can be made from pattern blocks. These include cars, trains, boats, rockets, flowers, animals, insects, birds, people, household objects, etc. The advantage of pattern block art is that it can be changed around, added, or turned into something else. All six of the shapes (green triangles, blue (thick) rhombi, red trapezoids, yellow hexagons, orange squares, and tan (thin) rhombi) are applied to make mosaics.

=== Linking cubes ===
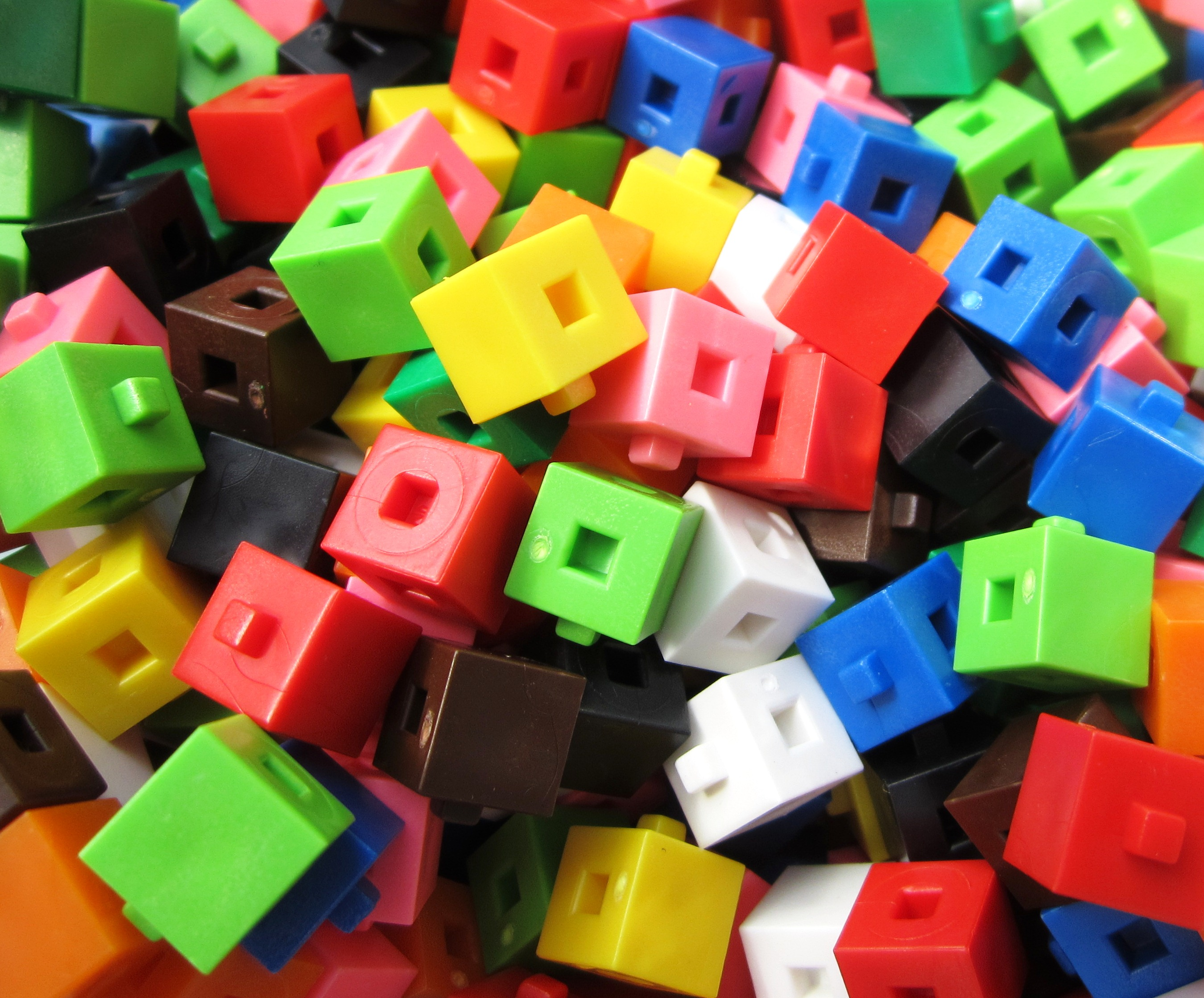
Interlocking centimeter linking cubes

Like pattern blocks, interlocking cubes can also be used for teaching patterns. Students may use the cubes to make long trains of patterns. Like the pattern blocks, the interlocking cubes provide a concrete experience for students to identify, extend, and create patterns. The difference is that a student can also physically decompose a pattern by the unit. For example, if a student made a pattern train that followed this sequence:

Red, blue, blue, blue, red, blue, blue, blue, red, blue, blue, blue, red, blue, blue, ...

the child could then be asked to identify the unit that is repeating (red, blue, blue, blue) and take apart the pattern by each unit. These can be used to teach addition, subtraction, multiplication and division, guesstimation, measuring, and graphing, perimeter, area, and volume.

=== Tiles ===
Tiles are one small colored squares used much the same way as interlocking cubes. The difference is that tiles cannot be locked together. They remain as separate pieces, which in many teaching scenarios, may be more ideal.

These three types of mathematical manipulatives can be used to teach the same concepts. It is critical that students learn math concepts using a variety of tools. For example, as students learn to make patterns, they should be able to create patterns using all three of these tools. Seeing the same concept represented in multiple ways as well as using a variety of concrete models will expand students’ understandings.

=== Number lines ===
To teach integer addition and subtraction, a number line is often used. A typical positive/negative number line spans from −20 to 20. For a problem such as "−15 + 17", students are told to "find −15 and count 17 spaces to the right".

== See also ==
- Attribute blocks
