= Catherine Stern =

German educationist, naturalist and non-fiction writer (1894-1973)

Catherine Brieger Stern (1894–1973) was a German psychologist and educator. Born under the name Käthe Brieger, she developed sets of mathematical manipulatives similar to Cuisenaire rods for children to use in building up their number sense and knowledge of arithmetic. Her book, Children Discover Arithmetic (1949) was used by others to work on the problems that children face when learning arithmetic.

In 1938, she emigrated to the United States. From 1940 to 1943, she was a research assistant to Max Wertheimer at the New School for Social Research.

== Publications ==
- Children Discover Arithmetic, Catherine Stern, Harper & Row, 1949.
- Experimenting with Numbers, Catherine Stern, Margaret Stern and Toni S. Gould. Houghton Mifflin Co., 1950
- Structural Arithmetic I, II, III, Teachers Guide and Workbooks, with M. Stern and T. Gould. Houghton Mifflin Co., 1952
- Structural Reading Program, Teachers Guides and Workbooks, A through E, with M. Stern and T. Gould, Random House, 1963.
- Children Discover Reading, with T. Gould, Random House, 1965.
- Children Discover Arithmetic, Catherine Stern and Margaret B. Stern. Harper & Row, 1971.
