= Education Development Center =

- Founded: August 11, 1958; 67 years ago
- Merger of: Educational Services Incorporated, Institute for Educational Innovation
- Type: Nonprofit research and development organization
- Tax ID no.: 04-2241718
- Legal status: 501(c)(3)
- Purpose: To design, implement, and evaluate programs to improve education, health, and economic opportunity worldwide.
- Headquarters: 43 Foundry Avenue, Waltham, Massachusetts, U.S.
- Coordinates: 42.370611°N 71.219119°W
- Region served: United States and 20 countries
- Chair of the Board, Board Director and Advisor: Ciara A. Burnham
- Chief Executive Officer: Siobhan Murphy
- Subsidiaries: Education Dev Center Program in Nigeria Limited by Guarantee
- Revenue: $146,566,862 (2017)
- Expenses: $145,050,590 (2017)
- Employees: 900 in U.S., 400 outside U.S. (2016)
- Website: www.edc.org

The Education Development Center (EDC) is a global nonprofit organization to improve education, promote health, and expand economic opportunity across the United States and in more than 80 other countries. EDC headquarters are in Waltham, Massachusetts, and main offices in Washington, D.C., New York City, and Chicago. EDC has 1,400 employees worldwide.

EDC uses technology, most notably radio, to provide educational opportunities for hard to reach learners. During the 2014 Ebola outbreak in Liberia, EDC and its partners used radio to provide lessons to students whose schools were closed due to the disease. Research conducted by EDC on teen smoking has been cited by communities and states as they consider raising the age to purchase tobacco to 21. EDC also works to improve the knowledge base in early childhood development.

Twice named in The Boston Globe’s 'Top Places to Work', EDC maintains a staff composed of scientists, researchers, mathematicians, educators, and health and technology specialists. Staff expertise includes research, training, policy, curriculum and materials development, as well as education technology, and their activities range from small seed projects to large-scale national and international initiatives.

== History ==
EDC created the curriculum Man: A Course of Study. The organization was founded (as Educational Services, Inc.) by Jerrold Zacharias, a physics professor at the Massachusetts Institute of Technology who started the Physical Science Study Committee, and is credited with developing PSSC Physics, funded by the National Science Foundation. PSSC Physics focused on science as the product of experiment and theory, constructed by real people. EDC introduced it successfully in schools across the country and eventually in many parts of the world. Zacharias is credited with changing the way physics is taught in secondary schools and many of the PSSC films are still used in classrooms today.

In 1964, ESI received funding from the Carnegie Corporation of New York to address the high rate of college dropout among African American students. In response, EDC established pre-college centers at six Historically Black Colleges and Universities to increase opportunities for low-income students. The approach was later scaled up to become the model of the federal government’s Upward Bound program. In 1968, ESI merged with the Institute for Educational Innovation to form EDC.

One of EDC’s earliest projects was the Elementary Science Study (ESS) funded primarily by the National Science Foundation. In the 1960s, EDC developed dozens of classroom kits and accompanying teacher guides for teaching science and mathematics in the elementary and middle grades. Many spawned variations still in wide use in schools today. Examples include Attribute blocks and their variants which can be found in most elementary school classrooms. Also, Pattern Blocks are ubiquitous in U.S. classrooms, still in the very same form (colors and size) as EDC originally created them more than 50 years ago.
