= Base ten blocks =

Mathematical aid

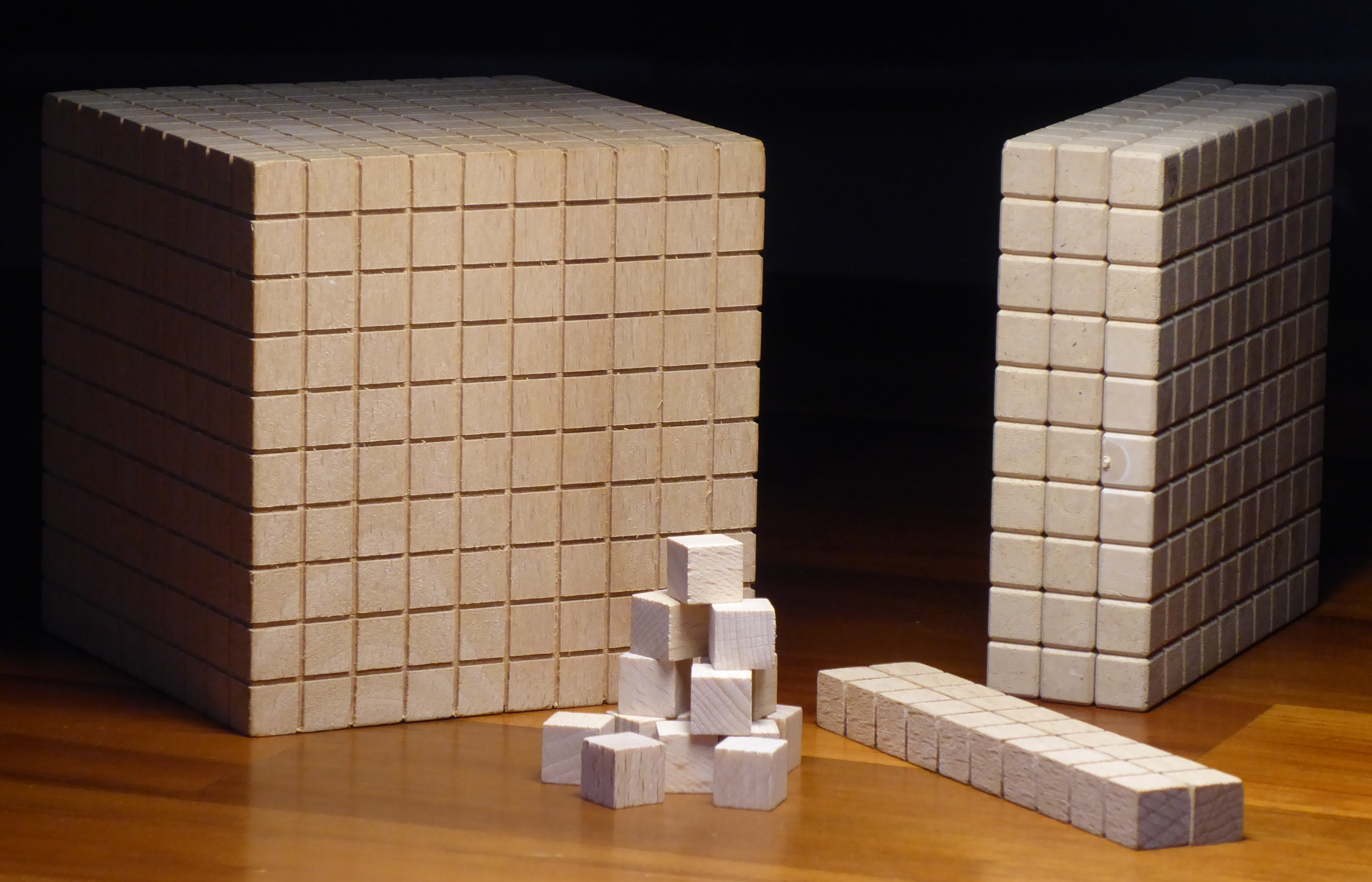
Wooden Dienes blocks in units of 1, 10, 100 and 1000

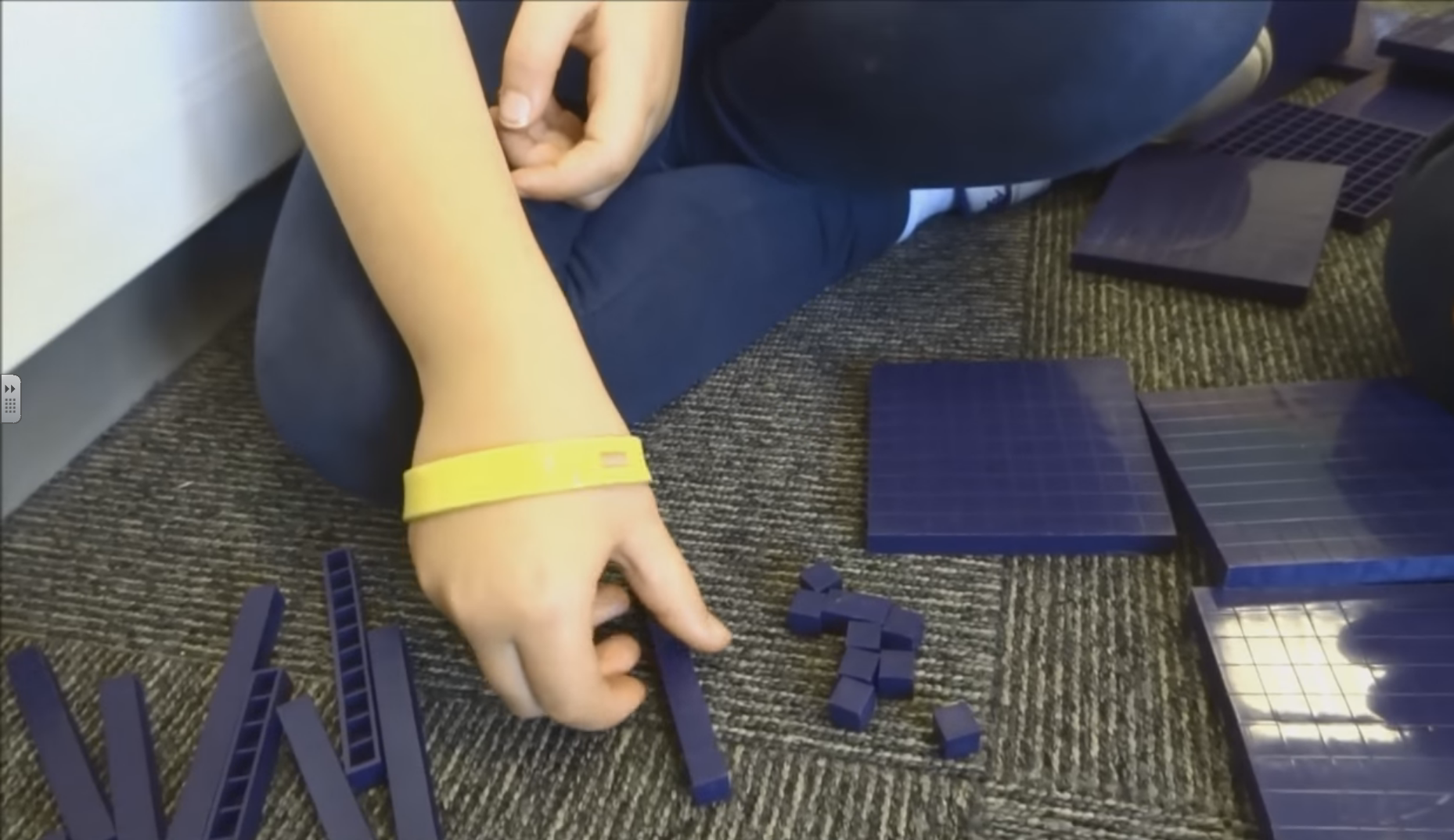
Plastic Dienes blocks in use

Base ten blocks, also known as Dienes blocks after popularizer Zoltán Dienes (Hungarian: [ˈdijɛnɛʃ]), are a mathematical manipulative used by students to practice counting and elementary arithmetic and develop number sense in the context of the decimal place-value system as a more concrete and direct representation than written Hindu–Arabic numerals. The three-dimensional blocks are made of a solid material such as plastic or wood and generally come in four sizes, each representing a power of ten used as a place in the decimal system: units (ones place), longs (tens place), flats (hundreds place) and blocks (thousands place). There are also computer programs available that simulate base ten blocks.

Base ten blocks were first described by Catherine Stern in 1949, though Maria Montessori had earlier introduced a similar manipulative, the "golden beads", which were assembled into the same shapes as base ten blocks. Dienes popularized the idea starting in the 1950s, recommending blocks for several number bases (two, three, etc.), called multibase arithmetic blocks (MAB), so students could concretely compare different number bases and learn about the decimal place-value system as one arbitrary choice among many possibilities. Multibase blocks found support in the New Math movement of the 1960s. Today, base ten blocks are widespread while blocks for other bases are rarely found.

== Use in mathematics instruction ==
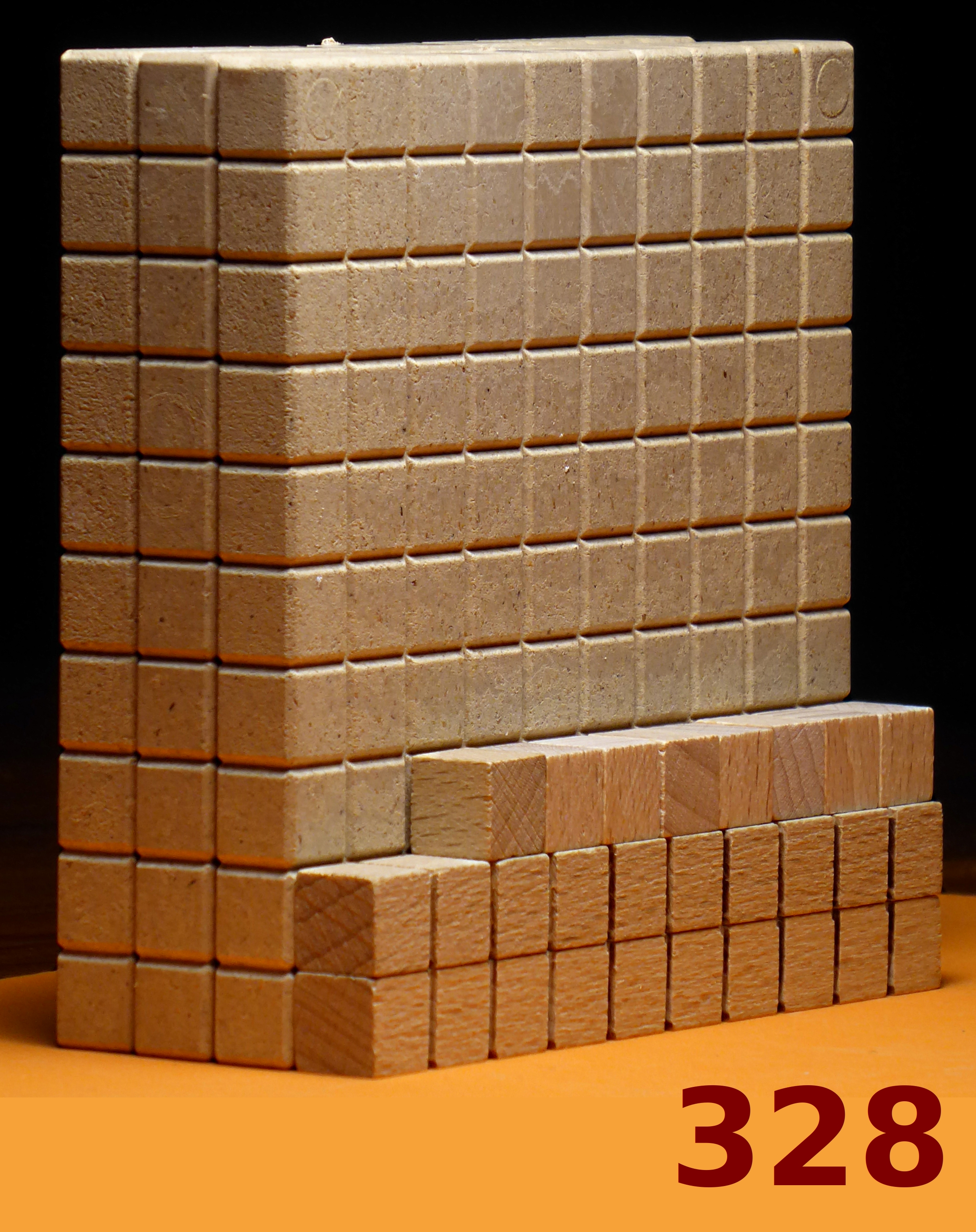
The number 328 represented in base ten blocks

Base ten blocks are popular in primary-school mathematics instruction, especially with topics that students struggle with such as multiplication. They are used by teachers to model concepts, as well as by students to reinforce their own understanding. Physically manipulating objects is an important technique used in learning basic mathematic principles, particularly at the early stages of cognitive development. The use of base ten blocks, as with other mathematical manipulatives, usually decreases as students move into higher grades.

The blocks can be used to teach carrying and borrowing in multi-digit arithmetic via "regrouping" (trading one block for ten of a smaller size, or vice versa). If the magnitude of the blocks is reinterpreted (for instance by taking the 1000-cube block to represent 1), then the blocks can be used to teach decimal fractions.

== See also ==
- Cuisenaire rods
- Number sense
- Mathematics education
