= Tangram =

Dissection puzzle

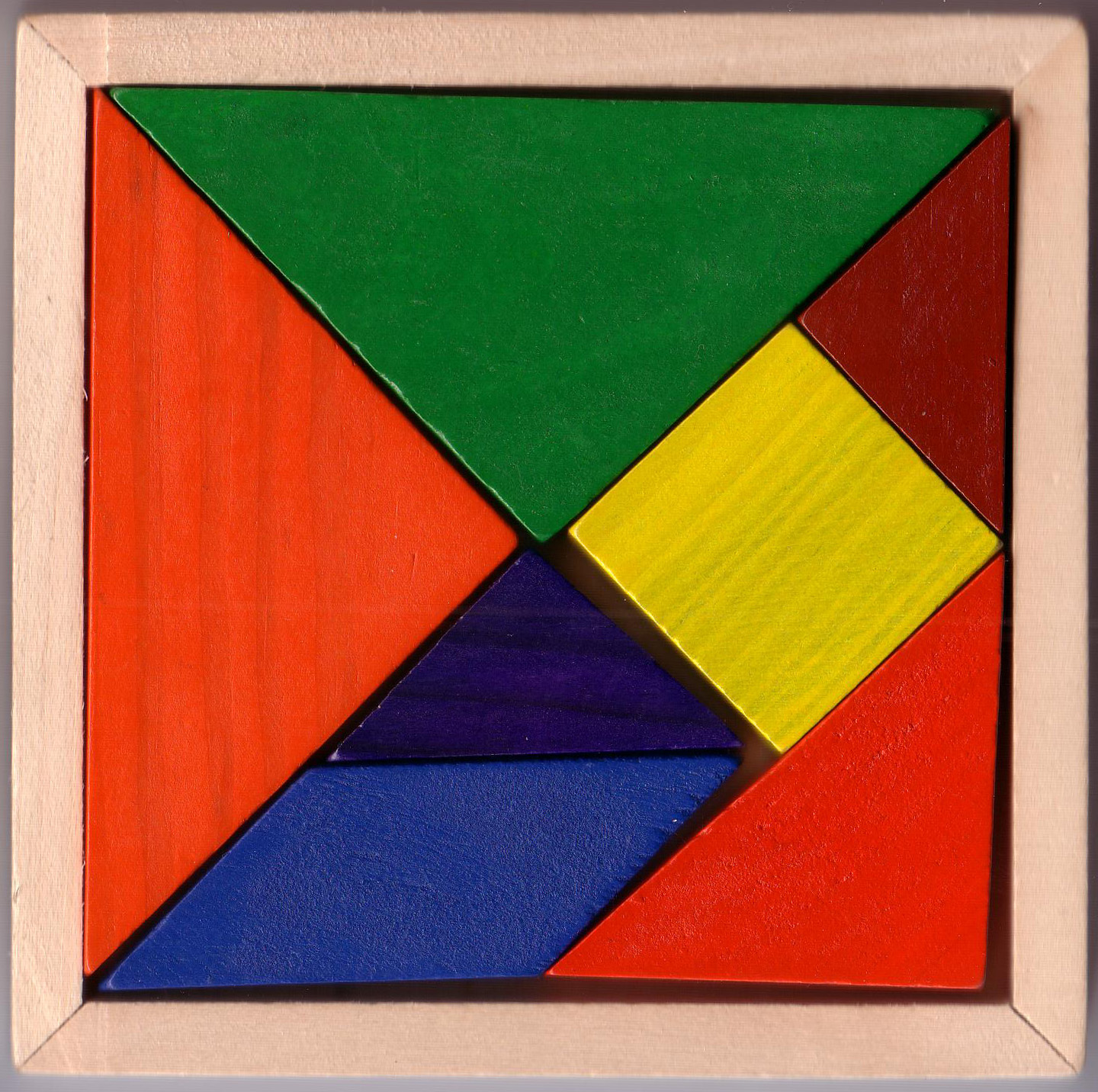
Like most modern sets, this wooden tangram is stored in the square configuration.

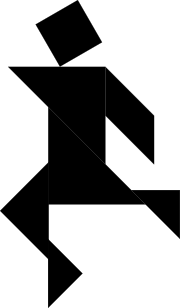
A simple tangram puzzle pattern (left) and its solution (right).

The tangram (Chinese: 七巧板; pinyin: qīqiǎobǎn; lit. 'seven boards of skill') is a dissection puzzle consisting of seven flat polygons, called tans, which are put together to form shapes. The objective is to replicate a pattern (given only an outline) generally found in a puzzle book using all seven pieces without overlap. Alternatively the tans can be used to create original minimalist designs that are either appreciated for their inherent aesthetic merits or as the basis for challenging others to replicate its outline. It is reputed to have been invented in China sometime around the late 18th century and then carried over to America and Europe by trading ships shortly after. It became very popular in Europe for a time, and then again during World War I. It is one of the most widely recognized dissection puzzles in the world and has been used for various purposes including amusement, art, and education.

== Etymology ==
The origin of the English word 'tangram' is unclear. One conjecture holds that it is a compound of the Greek element '-gram' derived from γράμμα ('written character, letter, that which is drawn') with the 'tan-' element being variously conjectured to be Chinese t'an 'to extend' or Cantonese t'ang 'Chinese'. Alternatively, the word may be derivative of the archaic English 'tangram' meaning "an odd, intricately contrived thing".

In either case, the first known use of the word is believed to be found in the 1848 book Geometrical Puzzle for the Young by mathematician and future Harvard University president Thomas Hill. Hill likely coined the term in the same work, and vigorously promoted the word in numerous articles advocating for the puzzle's use in education, and in 1864 the word received official recognition in the English language when it was included in Noah Webster's American Dictionary.

== History ==
=== Origins ===
Despite its relatively recent emergence in the West, there is a much older tradition of dissection amusements in China which likely played a role in its inspiration. In particular, the modular banquet tables of the Song dynasty bear an uncanny resemblance to the playing pieces of the tangram and there were books dedicated to arranging them together to form pleasing patterns.

Several Chinese sources broadly report a well-known Song dynasty polymath Huang Bosi 黄伯思 who developed a form of entertainment for his dinner guests based on creative arrangements of six small tables called 宴几 or 燕几(feast tables or swallow tables respectively). One diagram shows these as oblong rectangles, and other reports suggest a seventh table was added later, perhaps by a later inventor.

According to Western sources, however, the tangram's historical Chinese inventor is unknown except through the pen name Yang-cho-chu-shih (Dim-witted (?) recluse, recluse = 处士). It is believed that the puzzle was originally introduced in a book titled Ch'i chi'iao t'u, which was already reported as lost in 1815 by Shan-chiao in his book New Figures of the Tangram. Nevertheless, it is generally believed that the puzzle was invented about 20 years earlier.

The prominent third-century mathematician Liu Hui made use of construction proofs in his works and some bear a striking resemblance to the subsequently developed banquet tables which in turn seem to anticipate the tangram. While there is no reason to suspect that tangrams were used in the proof of the Pythagorean theorem, as is sometimes reported, it is likely that this style of geometric reasoning went on to exert an influence on Chinese cultural life that led directly to the puzzle.

The early years of attempting to date the Tangram were confused by the popular but fraudulently written history by famed puzzle maker Samuel Loyd in his 1908 The Eighth Book Of Tan. This work contains many whimsical features that aroused both interest and suspicion amongst contemporary scholars who attempted to verify the account. By 1910 it was clear that it was a hoax. A letter dated from this year from the Oxford Dictionary editor Sir James Murray on behalf of a number of Chinese scholars to the prominent puzzlist Henry Dudeney reads "The result has been to show that the man Tan, the god Tan, and the Book of Tan are entirely unknown to Chinese literature, history or tradition." Along with its many strange details The Eighth Book of Tan's date of creation for the puzzle of 4000 years in antiquity had to be regarded as entirely baseless and false.

=== Reaching the Western world (1815–1820s) ===
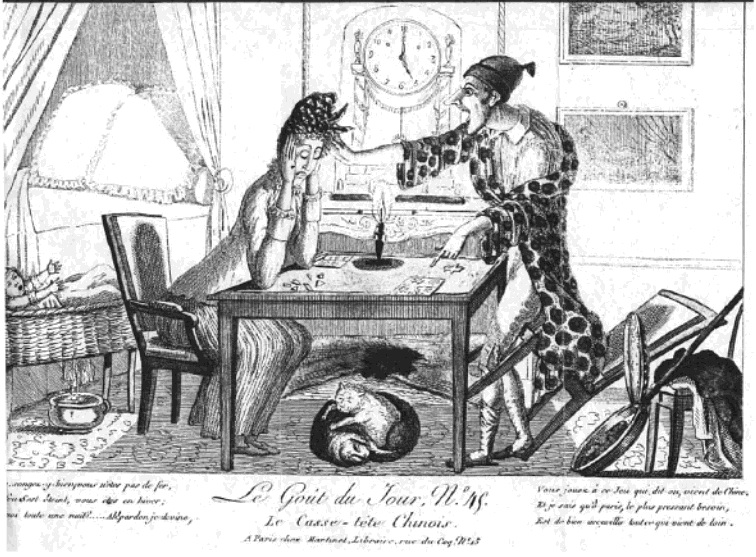
A caricature published in France in 1818, when the tangram craze was at its peak. The caption reads: " 'Take care of yourself, you're not made of steel. The fire has almost gone out and it is winter.' 'It kept me busy all night. Excuse me, I will explain it to you. You play this game, which is said to hail from China. And I tell you that what Paris needs right now is to welcome that which comes from far away.' "

The earliest extant tangram was given to the Philadelphia shipping magnate and congressman Francis Waln in 1802 but it was not until over a decade later that Western audiences, at large, would be exposed to the puzzle. In 1815, American Captain M. Donnaldson was given a pair of author Sang-Hsia-koi's books on the subject (one problem and one solution book) when his ship, Trader, docked there. They were then brought with the ship to Philadelphia in February 1816. The first tangram book to be published in America was based on the pair brought by Donnaldson.

The puzzle eventually reached England, where it became very fashionable. The craze quickly spread to other European countries. This was mostly due to a pair of British tangram books, The Fashionable Chinese Puzzle, and the accompanying solution book, Key. Soon, tangram sets were being exported in great number from China, made of various materials, from glass, to wood, to tortoise shell.

Many of these unusual and exquisite tangram sets made their way to Denmark. Danish interest in tangrams skyrocketed around 1818, when two books on the puzzle were published, to much enthusiasm. The first of these was Mandarinen (About the Chinese Game). This was written by a student at Copenhagen University, which was a non-fictional work about the history and popularity of tangrams. The second, Det nye chinesiske Gaadespil (The new Chinese Puzzle Game), consisted of 339 puzzles copied from The Eighth Book of Tan, as well as one original.

One contributing factor in the popularity of the game in Europe was that although the Catholic Church forbade many forms of recreation on the sabbath, they made no objection to puzzle games such as the tangram.

=== Second craze in Germany (1891–1920s) ===
Tangrams were first introduced to the German public by industrialist Friedrich Adolf Richter around 1891. The sets were made out of stone or false earthenware, and marketed under the name "The Anchor Puzzle".

More internationally, the First World War saw a great resurgence of interest in tangrams, on the homefront and trenches of both sides. During this time, it occasionally went under the name of "The Sphinx" an alternative title for the "Anchor Puzzle" sets.

== Paradoxes ==
Explanation of the two-monks paradox: In figure 1, side lengths are labelled assuming the square has unit sides. In figure 2, overlaying the bodies shows that footless body is larger by the foot's area. The change in area is often unnoticed as √2 is close to 1.5.

A tangram paradox is a dissection fallacy: Two figures composed with the same set of pieces, one of which seems to be a proper subset of the other. One famous paradox is that of the two monks, attributed to Henry Dudeney, which consists of two similar shapes, one with and the other missing a foot. In reality, the area of the foot is compensated for in the second figure by a subtly larger body.

The two-monks paradox – two similar shapes but one missing a foot:

The Magic Dice Cup tangram paradox – from Sam Loyd's book The 8th Book of Tan (1903). Each of these cups was composed using the same seven geometric shapes. But the first cup is whole, and the others contain vacancies of different sizes. (Notice that the one on the left is slightly shorter than the other two. The one in the middle is ever-so-slightly wider than the one on the right, and the one on the left is narrower still.)

Clipped square tangram paradox – from Loyd's book The Eighth Book of Tan (1903):

The seventh and eighth figures represent the mysterious square, built with seven pieces: then with a corner clipped off, and still the same seven pieces employed.

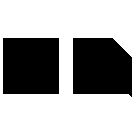

== Number of configurations ==
The 13 convex shapes matched with the tangram set

Over 6500 different tangram problems have been created from 19th-century texts alone, and the current number is ever-growing. Fu Traing Wang and Chuan-Chih Hsiung proved in 1942 that there are only thirteen convex tangram configurations (segments drawn between any two points on the configuration are always completely contained inside the configuration, i.e., configurations with no recesses in the outline).

== Pieces ==
Choosing a unit of measurement so that the seven pieces can be assembled to form a square of side one unit and having area one square unit, the seven pieces are:

- 2 large right triangles (hypotenuse 1, sides √2/2, area 1/4)
- 1 medium right triangle (hypotenuse √2/2, sides 1/2, area 1/8)
- 2 small right triangles (hypotenuse 1/2, sides √2/4, area 1/16)
- 1 square (sides √2/4, area 1/8)
- 1 parallelogram (sides of 1/2 and √2/4, height of 1/4, area 1/8)

Of these seven pieces, the parallelogram is unique in that it has no reflection symmetry but only rotational symmetry, and so its mirror image can be obtained only by flipping it over. Thus, it is the only piece that may need to be flipped when forming certain shapes.

== See also ==
- Tangram (video game)
- Egg of Columbus (tangram puzzle)
- Mathematical puzzle
- Ostomachion
- Tiling puzzle
- Attribute blocks
