= Geoboard =

Board with pegs used as a geometric demonstration

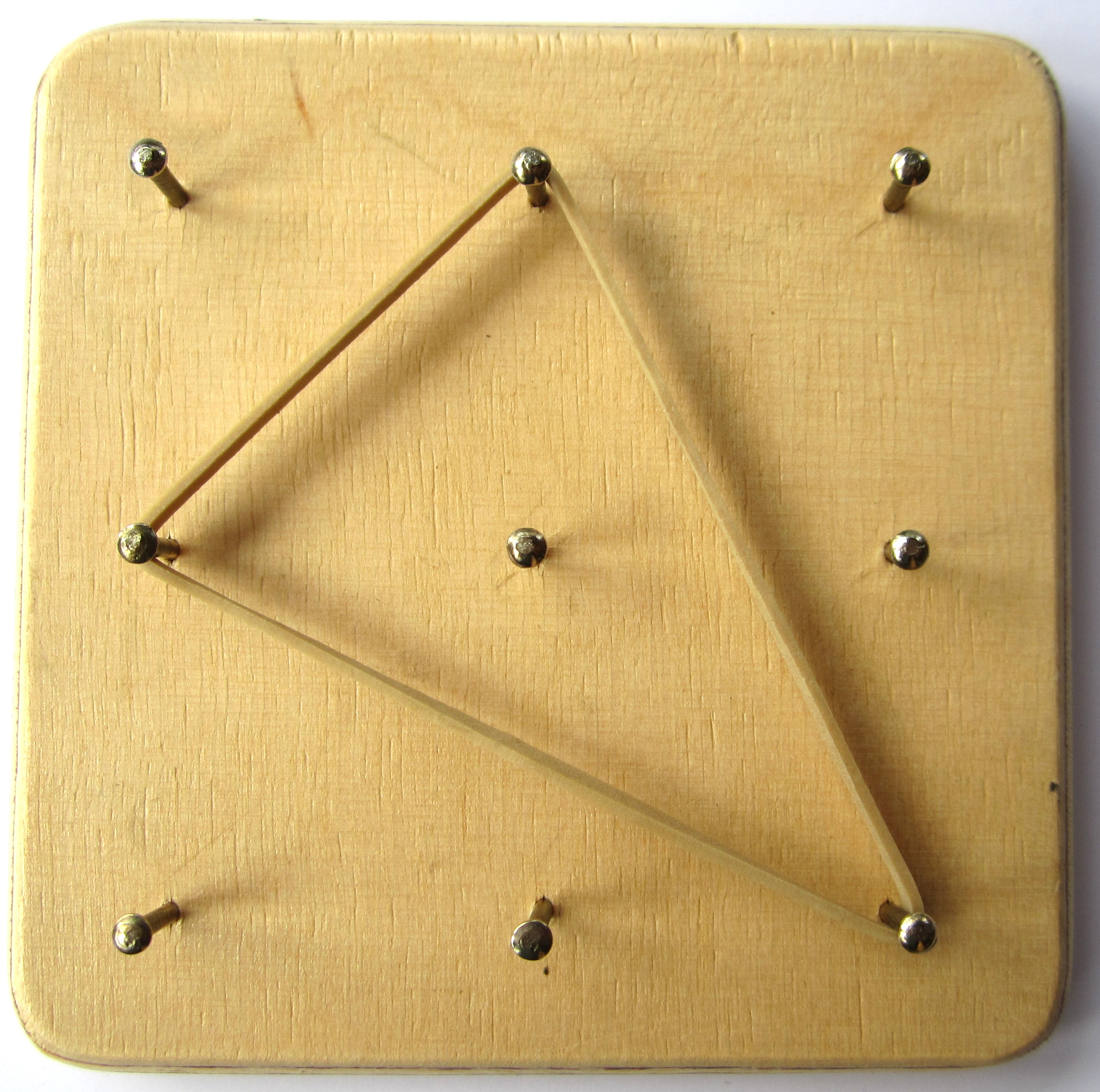
A wooden 3 × 3 geoboard

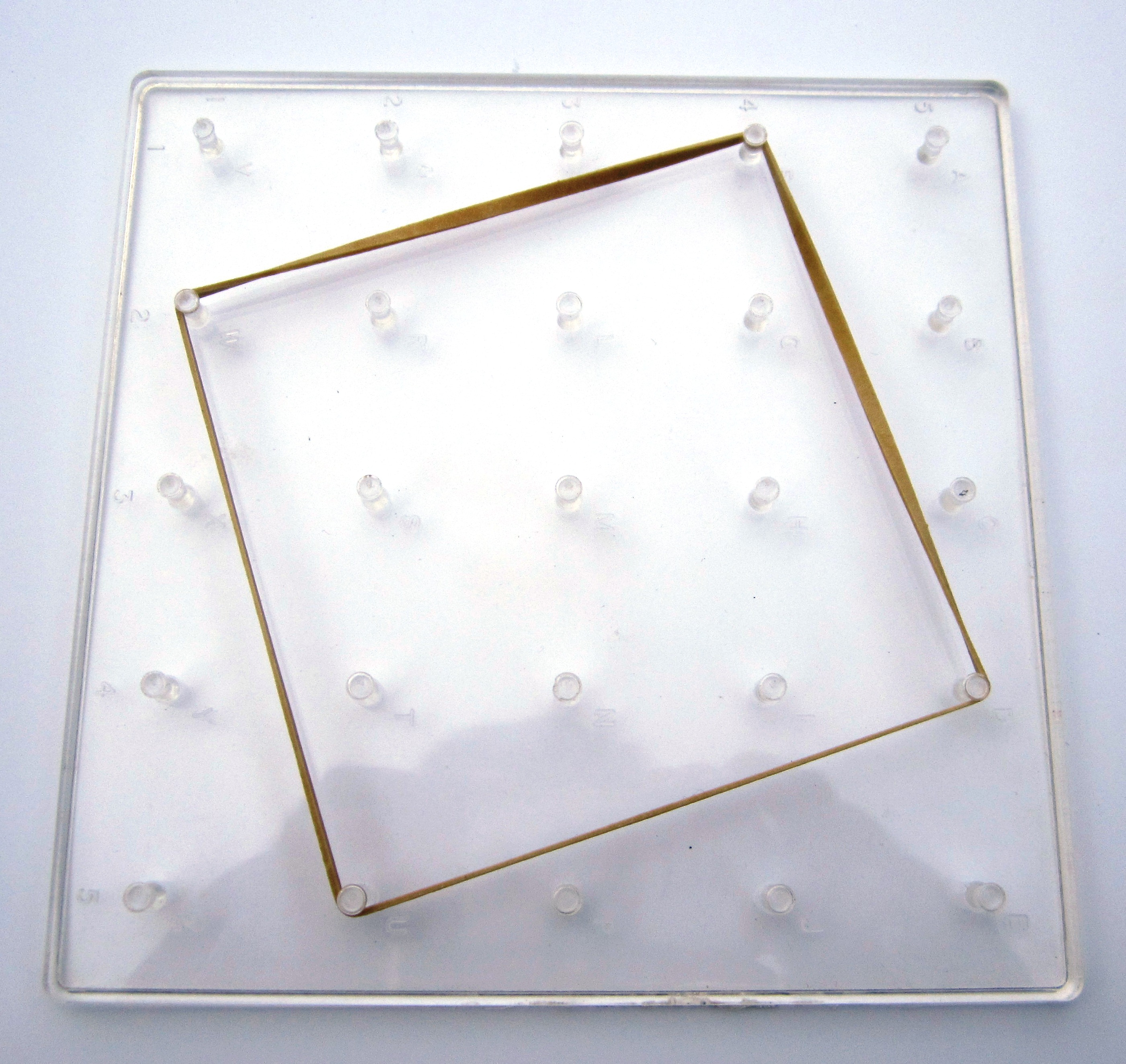
A plastic 5 × 5 geoboard

A geoboard is a mathematical manipulative used to explore basic concepts in plane geometry such as perimeter, area and the characteristics of triangles and other polygons. It consists of a physical board with a certain number of nails half driven in, around which are wrapped geo bands that are made of rubber. Normal rubber bands can also be used.

Geoboards were invented and popularized in the 1950s by Egyptian mathematician Caleb Gattegno (1911-1988).

== Structure and use ==
Geoboard is a board. A variety of boards are used. Originally made out of plywood and brass nails or pegs, geoboards are now usually made out of plastic. They may have an upright square lattice of 9, 16 or 25 nails or more, or a circle of nails around a central nail. Students are asked to place rubber bands around the nails to explore geometric concepts or to solve mathematical puzzles.

Geoboards may be used to learn about:

- plane shapes;
- translation;
- rotation;
- reflection;
- similarity;
- co-ordination;
- counting;
- right angles;
- pattern;
- classification;
- scaling;
- position;
- congruence;
- area;
- perimeter.

Two-dimensional representations of the geoboard may be applied to ordinary paper using rubber stamps or special "geoboard paper" with diagrams of geoboards may be used to help capture a student's explanations of the concept they have discovered or illustrated on the geoboard. There are also a number of online virtual geoboards.
