= Attribute blocks =

Educational Toy

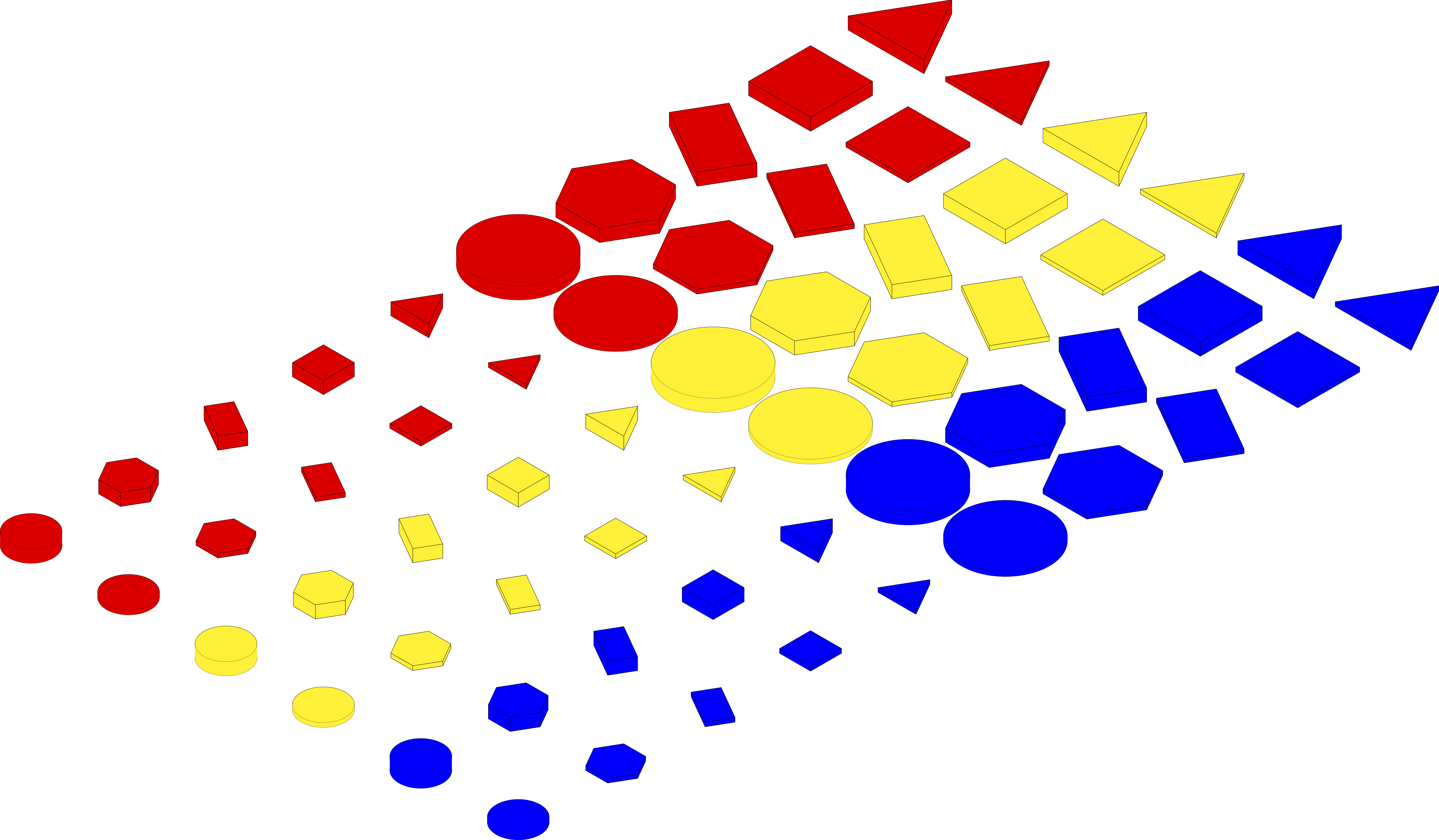
A set of 60 attribute blocks

Attribute blocks, also called logic blocks, are mathematical manipulatives used to teach logic. Each block in a set has a unique combination of four attributes, namely size, color, shape, and thickness.
