= Numeral prefix =

Prefix derived from numerals or other numbers

Numeral or number prefixes are prefixes derived from numerals or occasionally other numbers. In English and many other languages, they are used to coin numerous series of words. For example:

- triangle, quadrilateral, pentagon, hexagon, octagon (shape with 3 sides, 4 sides, 5 sides, 6 sides, 8 sides)
- simplex, duplex (communication in only 1 direction at a time, in 2 directions simultaneously)
- unicycle, bicycle, tricycle (vehicle with 1 wheel, 2 wheels, 3 wheels)
- dyad, triad, tetrad (2 parts, 3 parts, 4 parts)
- twins, triplets, quadruplets (multiple birth of 2 children, 3 children, 4 children)
- biped, quadruped, hexapod (animal with 2 feet, 4 feet, 6 feet)
- September, October, November, December (7th month, 8th month, 9th month, 10th month) (Note: These months' prefixes originated in a conjectured, pre-historical Roman 10 month calendar. See Roman Calendar.)
- binary, ternary, octal, decimal, hexadecimal (numbers expressed in base 2, base 3, base 8, base 10, base 16)
- Unary, binary, ternary, quaternary, quinary, senary, septenary, octonary, nonary, denary (related to having a certain number of something—parts, components, elements, divisions, etc.)
- septuagenarian, octogenarian (a person 70–79 years old, 80–89 years old)
- centipede, millipede, myriapod (subgroups of arthropods with numerous feet, suggesting but not implying approximately 100, 1000, and 10000 feet respectively)

In many European languages there are two principal systems, taken from Latin and Greek, each with several subsystems; in addition, Sanskrit occupies a marginal position. (Note: See Mendeleev's predicted elements for the most common use of Sanskrit numerical prefixes.) There is also an international set of metric prefixes, which are used in the world's standard measurement system.

== Table of number prefixes in English ==
In the following prefixes, a final vowel is normally dropped before a root that begins with a vowel, with the exceptions of bi-, which is extended to bis- before a vowel; among the other monosyllables, du-, di-, dvi-, and tri-, never vary.

Words in the cardinal category are cardinal numbers, such as the English one, two, three, which name the count of items in a sequence. The multiple category are adverbial numbers, like the English once, twice, thrice, that specify the number of events or instances of otherwise identical or similar items. Enumeration with the distributive category originally was meant to specify one each, two each or one by one, two by two, etc., giving how many items of each type are desired or had been found, although distinct word forms for that meaning are now mostly lost. The ordinal category are based on ordinal numbers such as the English first, second, third, which specify position of items in a sequence. In Latin and Greek, the ordinal forms are also used for fractions for amounts higher than 2; only the fraction 1/ 2 has special forms.

The same suffix may be used with more than one category of number, as for example the ordinal numbers secondary and tertiary and the distributive numbers binary and ternary.

For the hundreds, there are competing forms: Those in -gent-, from the original Latin, and those in -cent-, derived from centi-, etc. plus the prefixes for 1 through 9 .

Many of the items in the following tables are not in general use, but may rather be regarded as coinages by individuals. In scientific contexts, either scientific notation or SI prefixes are used to express very large or very small numbers, and not unwieldy prefixes.

Number prefixes in English
Number	Latin derived				Greek (Note: The numbering adjectives in Greek are inflectional for grammatical gender (i.e. there is monos [masculine for single/alone], mone [feminine for single/alone] and monon [neuter for single/alone]), grammatical case (i.e. nominative, genitive, etc.) and grammatical number (singular/plural). The prefixes are produced from the default grammatical type (masculine/nominative/singular).) derived			Sanskrit
Number	Cardinal	Multiple	Distributive	Ordinal	Cardinal	Multiple, proportional, or quantitative	Ordinal	Sanskrit
0	nulli-			nullesim-	miden-, ouden-	—	medeproto-, oudeproto-	shūnya-
1/ 12	unci-			—	Greek uses ordinals to name fractions; (i.e. dodecato-)			—
1/ 8	octant-	—	—	—	As above; ogdoö–			—
1/ 6	sextant-	—	—	—	As above; hecto			—
1/ 5	quintant-	—	—	—	As above; pempto–			—
1/ 4	quadrant-	—	—	—	As above; tetarto–			—
1/ 3	trient-	—	—	—	As above; trito–			—
1/ 2	semi-	—	demi- (Note: Demi- is French, from Latin dimidium.)	—	hemi- ("half") (Note: e.g. hemisphere)	—	—	—
3/ 4	dodrant-	—	—	—	—			—
1	uni- (Note: e.g. universe, unilateral) sol- (Note: sol (sōlus) is more appropriately a Latin root for "only", "oneself".) (Note: e.g. solo, soliloquy)	sim- (Note: sim- (sin-) is found in the words simplex, simple.)	singul-	prim-	mono- ("one", "alone") (Note: e.g. monogamy) holo- ("entire", "full") (Note: e.g. holocaust, holography) hen- (Note: The Greek prefix for 'one' is normally mono- 'alone'. Hen- 'one' is only used in compound numbers (hendeka- 11) and a few words like henad (= monad). Haplo- 'single' is found is a few technical words such as haploid.) rare	mono- ("one, alone") hapax- ("once") haplo- ("single") monad- ("one of a kind", "unique", "unit")	prot- (Note: e.g. proton, protozoa) protaio- ("[every] first day")	eka-
1 1/ 4	—	quasqui- (Note: e.g. quasquicentennial)	—	—	—	—	—	—
1 1/ 2	—	sesqui- (Note: e.g. sesquicentennial, sesquipedalian)	—	—	—	—	—	—
2	du-	bi-, bis- (Note: e.g. bireme, bilingual, bipolar, bipartisan)	bin-	second-	di-, dy-, duo-, dyo-	dis- ("twice") common dyakis- ("twice") rare diplo- ("double") dyad- ("two of a kind")	deuter- (Note: e.g. Deuteron/ium, Deuteronomy) deuteraio- ("[every] second day")	dvi-
2 1/ 2	—	sester- (Note: e.g. sesterterpene) semiquin- (Note: e.g. semiquincentennial)	—	—	—	—	—	—
3	tri- (Note: e.g. trireme)	ter-	tern-, trin-	terti-	tri- (Note: e.g. triathlon, Tripolis)	tris- ("thrice") common triakis- ("thrice") rare triplo- ("triple") triad- ("three of a kind")	trit- ("third") (Note: e.g. Triton/ium) tritaio- ("[every] third day")	tri-
4	quadri-, quadru- (Note: The forms related to quattuor "four", like the previous three integers, are irregular in Latin and other Indo-European languages, and the details, while presumably a form of assimilation, are unclear. In particular, quadri- has the alternate form quadru- before p in some Latin words, such as quadruple.)	quater-	quatern-	quart-	tetra-, tessara-	tetrakis- ("four times") tetraplo- ("quadruple") tetrad- ("four of a kind") (Note: e.g. tetrahedron)	tetarto- ("fourth") tetartaio- ("[every] fourth day")	catur-
5	quinque-	—	quin-	quint-	penta-	pentakis- pentaplo- pentad- (Note: e.g. pentahedron)	pempt- pemptaio-	pañca-
6	sexa- (Note: Sometimes Greek hexa- is used in Latin compounds, such as hexadecimal, due to taboo avoidance with the English word sex.)	—	sen-	sext-	hexa-	hexakis- hexaplo- hexad- (Note: e.g. hexahedron)	hect- hectaio-	ṣaṭ-
7	septem-, septi- (Note: e.g. September)		septen-	septim-	hepta- (Note: e.g. heptathlon)	heptakis- heptaplo- heptad-	hebdomo- ("seventh") hebdomaio- ("seventh day") (Note: e.g. hebdomas)	sapta-
8	octo- (Note: e.g. October)	—	octon-	octav-	octo- (Note: e.g. octopus)	octakis- octaplo- octad- (Note: e.g. octahedron)	ogdoö- ogdoaio-	aṣṭa-
9	novem- (Note: e.g. November)		noven-	nona-	ennea-	enneakis- enneaplo- ennead-	enat- enataio-	nava-
10	decem-, dec- (Note: e.g. December)		den-	decim-	deca- (Note: e.g. decathlon, decahedron, decagon)	decakis- decaplo- decad-	decat- decataio-	dasha-
11	undec-		unden-	undecim-	hendeca-	hendeca/kis/plo/d-	hendecat-/o/aio-	ekadasha-
12	duodec-		duoden- (Note: e.g. duodenum)	duodecim-	dodeca- (Note: e.g. dodecahedron)	dodeca/kis/plo/d-	dodecat-/o/aio-	dvadasha-
13	tredec-		treden-	tredecim-	tria(kai)deca-, decatria- (Note: e.g. triskaidekaphobia)	tris(kai)decakis-, decatria/kis/plo/d-	decatotrito- etc.	trayodasha-
14	quattuordec-		quattuorden-	quattuordecim- quartadecim-	tessara(kai)deca-, decatettara-, decatessara-	tetra(kai)decakis-, decatetra/kis/plo/d- (Note: e.g. tetradecahedron/ decatetrahedron)	decatotetarto-	chaturdasha-
15	quinquadec-, quindec-		quinden-	quindecim- quintadecim-	pente(kai)deca-, decapente-	penta(kai)decakis-, decapentakis- etc.	decatopempto-	panchadasha-
16	sedec-, sexdec- (but hybrid hexadecimal)		seden-	sedecim- sextadecim-	hexa(kai)deca-, hekkaideca-, decahex-	hexa(kai)decakis-, decahexakis- etc.	decatohecto-	shodasha-
17	septendec-		septenden-	septendecim- septimadecim-	hepta(kai)deca-, decahepta-	hepta(kai)decakis-, decaheptakis- etc.	decatohebdomo-	saptadasha-
18	octodec-		octoden-	octodecim- duodevicesim-	octo(kai)deca-, decaocto-	octa(kai)decakis-, decaoctakis- etc.	decatoogdoö-	ashtadasha-
19	novemdec-, novendec- undeviginti-		novemden- novenden-	novemdecim- novendecim- undevisim-	ennea(kai)deca-, decaennea-	ennea(kai)decakis-, decaenneakis- etc.	decatoenato-	navadasha-
20 (Note: For Latinate 21, 22, etc., the pattern for the teens is followed: unvigint-, duovigint-, etc. For higher numbers, the reverse order may be found: 36 is trigintisex-. For Greek, the word kai ("and") is used: icosikaihena-, icosikaidi-, pentacontakaipenta-, etc. In these and in the tens, the kai is frequently omitted, though not in triskaidekaphobia. (The inconsistency of triskaidekaphobia with the table above is explained by the fact that the Greek letter kappa can be transliterated either "c" or "k".) In chemical nomenclature, 11 is generally mixed Latin-Greek undeca-, and the 20s are based on -cos-, for example tricos- for 23.)	viginti-		vicen-, vigen-	vigesim-	(e)icosi-	eicosa/kis/plo/d- (Note: e.g. (e)icosahedron)	eicosto-	vimshati-
22	duovigint-				(e)icosidyo-, dyo(e)icosi- rare (Note: e.g. docosa-hexaenoic acid (a pejoration of dyoicosa-hexanoic))	(e)icosidyakis- (e)icosidiplo- (e)icosidyad-	eicostodeutero-	—
24	quattuorvigint-				(e)icositettara-, (e)icosikaitettara- rare	(e)icositetrakis- (e)icositetraplo- (e)icositetrad- (Note: e.g. (e)icositetragon)	eicostotetarto-	chaturvimshati-
25	quinvigint-				(e)icosipente- (Note: e.g. eicosapenta-enoic acid)	(e)icosipentakis- (e)icosipentaplo- (e)icosipentad-	eicostopempto-	—
30	triginti-		tricen-	trigesim-	triaconta-	triacontakis- etc. (Note: e.g. triacontahedron)	triacosto-	trimshat-
31	untriginti-				triacontahen-	triacontahenakis- triacontahenaplo- triacontahenad-	triacostoproto- triacostoprotaio-	—
40	quadraginti-		quadragen-	quadragesim-	tettaraconta-, tessaraconta-	tettaracontakis-, tessaracontakis- etc.	tessaracosto-	chatvarimshat-
50	quinquaginti-		quinquagen-	quinquagesim-	penteconta- (Note: e.g. penteconter)	pentecontakis- etc.	pentecosto- (Note: e.g. pentecost)	panchashat-
60	sexaginti-		sexagen-	sexagesim-	hexeconta-	hexecontakis- etc.	hexecosto-	shasti-
70	septuaginti- (Note: e.g. Septuagint)		septuagen-	septuagesim-	hebdomeconta-	hebdomecontakis- etc.	hebdomecosto-	saptati-
80	octogint-		octogen-	octogesim-	ogdoëconta-	ogdoëcontakis- etc.	ogdoëcosto-	ashiti-
90	nonagint-		nonagen-	nonagesim-	eneneconta-	enenecontakis- etc.	enenecosto-	navati-
100	centi-		centen-	centesim-	hecato(n)-	hecatontakis- hundred times hecatontaplo- hundred-multiple hecatontad- hundred of a kind also abbreviated in hec[aton]tad-	hecatosto- hundredth hecatostaio- the hundredth day	shata–
120	viginticenti-		—	—	hecaton(e)icosi-	hecaton(e)icosakis- etc.	hecatostoeicosto-	—
150	—		sesquicenten- (Note: e.g. sesquicentennial)	—	—	—	—	—
200	ducenti-		ducen-, bicenten-	ducentesim-	diacosia-	diacosakis- etc.	diacosiosto-	—
250	—		semiquincenten- (Note: e.g. semiquincentennial)	—	—	—	—	—
300	trecenti-		trecen-, tercenten-, tricenten-	trecentesim-	triacosia- etc.	triacosakis- triacosaplo- triacosad-	triacosiosto-	—
400	quadringenti-		quadringen-, quatercenten-, quadricenten-	quadringentesim-	tetracosia-	tetracosakis- etc.	tetracosiosto-	—
500	quingent-, quincent-		quingen-, quingenten-, quincenten-	quingentesim-	pentacosia-	pentacosakis- etc.	pentacosiosto-	—
600	sescenti-, sexcenti-		sescen-, sexcenten-	sescentesim-	hexacosia-	hexacosakis- etc.	hexacosiosto-	—
700	septingenti-		septingen-, septingenten-, septcenten-	septingentesim-	heptacosia-	heptacosakis- etc.	heptacosiosto-	—
800	octingenti-		octingen-, octingenten-, octocenten-	octingentesim-	octacosia-	octacosakis- etc.	octacosiosto-	—
900	nongenti-		nongen-	nongentesim-	ennacosi- derived from en(n)iacosia-, a pejoration of enneacosia-	enneacosakis- etc.	enacosiost-, alt. spelling en(n)iacosiost(o)- a pejoration of enneacosiosto-	—
1000	milli-		millen-	millesim-	khili-, kilo-	khiliakis- khiliaplo- chiliad-	chiliost-	sahasra–
2000	duomilli		—	—	diskhili-	diskhiliakis- etc.	diskhiliosto-	—
3000	tremilli-				triskhili-	—	triskhiliost-	—
5000	quinmilli–				pentaciskhili-	—	—	—
10000	decamilli–				myria-, (Note: e.g. myriapoda) decakiskhilia-	myriakis- myriaplo- myriad- decakiskhiliakis- etc.	myriast-, decakiskhiliosto-	ayuta–
80000	octogintmilli–				octacismyri-	—	—	—
100000 or 10^{5}	centimilli–				decakismyria-, hecatontakiskhilia-	decakismyriakis-, hecatontakiskhiliakis-	etc.	laksha–
1000000 or 10^{6}	—				hecatommyria- (see also mega-)	hecatommyriakis- ("a million times") hecatommyriaplo- (million-multiple) hecatommyriad- (a million of a kind)	hecatommyriosto- (ranked millionth; also one piece of a million [fraction] see above in fractions) hecatommyriostaio- ("the millionth day")	—
∞	infini-	—	—	—	apeiro-	—		
Few	pauci- (Note: e.g. pauciparous)			—	oligo- (Note: e.g. oligopoly, oligarchy, oligomer, oligonucleotide, oligopeptide, oligosaccharide)	—	—	—
Many (more than 1)	multi-, pluri- (Note: e.g. multilingual, multiple, pluripotent, pluricentric)			—	poly- (Note: e.g. polyhedra, polygamy, polypod, polyglot, polymath, polymer)	pollakis- (many times) pollaplo- (multiple) plethos- (many of a kind) (Note: e.g. plethora)	pollosto- (rank/order of many [manieth])	bahut–

Examples

== Occurrences ==
- Numerical prefixes occur in 19th-, 20th-, and 21st-century coinages, mainly the terms that are used in relation to or that are the names of technological innovations, such as hexadecimal and bicycle. Also used in medals that commemorate an anniversary, such as sesquicentennial (150 years), centennial (100 years), or bicentennial (200 years).
- They occur in constructed words such as systematic names. Systematic names use numerical prefixes derived from Greek, with one principal exception, nona-.
- They occur as prefixes to units of measure in the SI system. See SI prefix.
- They occur as prefixes to units of computer data. See binary prefixes.
- They occur in words in the same languages as the original number word, and their respective derivatives. (Strictly speaking, some of the common citations of these occurrences are not in fact occurrences of the prefixes. For example: millennium is not formed from milli-, but is in fact derived from the same shared Latin root – mille.)

Because of the common inheritance of Greek and Latin roots across the Romance languages, the import of much of that derived vocabulary into non-Romance languages (such as into English via Norman French), and the borrowing of 19th and 20th century coinages into many languages, the same numerical prefixes occur in many languages.

Numerical prefixes are not restricted to denoting integers. Some of the SI prefixes denote negative powers of 10, i.e. division by a multiple of 10 rather than multiplication by it. Several common-use numerical prefixes denote vulgar fractions.

Words containing non-technical numerical prefixes are usually not hyphenated. This is not an absolute rule, however, and there are exceptions (for example: quarter-deck occurs in addition to quarterdeck). There are no exceptions for words comprising technical numerical prefixes, though. Systematic names and words comprising SI prefixes and binary prefixes are not hyphenated, by definition.

Nonetheless, for clarity, dictionaries list numerical prefixes in hyphenated form, to distinguish the prefixes from words with the same spellings (such as duo- and duo).

Several technical numerical prefixes are not derived from words for numbers. (mega- is not derived from a number word, for example.) Similarly, some are only derived from words for numbers inasmuch as they are word play. (Peta- is word play on penta-, for example. See its etymology for details.) The metric prefixes peta, exa, zetta, yotta, ronna, and quetta are based on the Ancient Greek or Ancient Latin numbers from 5 to 10, referring to the fifth through tenth powers of 1000. The initial letter h has been removed from some of these stems and the initial letters z, y, r, and q have been added, ascending in reverse alphabetical order, to avoid confusion with other metric prefixes.

The root language of a numerical prefix need not be related to the root language of the word that it prefixes. Some words comprising numerical prefixes are hybrid words.

In certain classes of systematic names, there are a few other exceptions to the rule of using Greek-derived numerical prefixes. The IUPAC nomenclature of organic chemistry, for example, uses the numerical prefixes derived from Greek, except for the prefix for 9 (as mentioned) and the prefixes from 1 to 4 (meth-, eth-, prop-, and but-), which are not derived from words for numbers. These prefixes were invented by the IUPAC, deriving them from the pre-existing names for several compounds that it was intended to preserve in the new system: methane (via methyl, which is in turn from the Greek word for wine), ethane (from ethyl coined by Justus von Liebig in 1834), propane (from propionic, which is in turn from pro- and the Greek word for fat), and butane (from butyl, which is in turn from butyric, which is in turn from the Latin word for butter).

=== Cardinal Latin series ===
- unicycle, bicycle, tricycle, quadricycle
- uniped, biped, triped, quadruped, centipede, millipede

=== Distributive Latin series ===
- unary, binary, trinary, quaternary, quinary, senary, ... vicenary ... centenary ...
- denarian, vicenarian, tricenarian, quadragenarian, quinquagenarian, sexagenarian, septuagenarian, octogenarian, nonagenarian, centenarian, ... millenarian

=== Greek series ===
- monad, dyad, triad, tetrad, pentad, hexad, heptad, ogdoad, ennead, decad, ... triacontad, ... hecatontad, chiliad, myriad
- digon, trigon, tetragon, pentagon, hexagon, heptagon, octagon, enneagon, decagon, hendecagon, dodecagon, ... enneadecagon, icosagon, triacontagon, ... chiliagon, myriagon
- trilogy, tetralogy, pentalogy, hexalogy, heptalogy
- monopod, dipod, tripod, tetrapod, hexapod, octopod, decapod

=== Mixed language series ===
- pentane, hexane, heptane, octane, nonane, (Note: In organic chemistry, most prefixes are Greek but the prefixes for 9 and 11 are Latin.) decane, undecane, ... icosane
- binary, ternary, quaternary, quinary, senary, septenary, octal, nonary, decimal, duodecimal, hexadecimal, vigesimal, quadrovigesimal, duotrigesimal, sexagesimal, octogesimal
- The SI prefixes, peta-, exa-, zetta-, yotta-, ronna-, and quetta-, are based on the Ancient Greek or Ancient Latin numbers from 5 to 10, referring to the fifth through tenth powers of 1000. The initial letter h has been removed from some of these stems and the initial letters z, y, r, and q have been added, ascending in reverse alphabetical order, to avoid confusion with other metric prefixes.

== See also ==
- IUPAC numerical multiplier
- List of numbers
- List of numeral systems
- List of commonly used taxonomic affixes
- English numerals
- Names for tuples of specific lengths

== Bibliography ==
- Bauer-Ramazani, Christine (April 2008). "Prefixes—Amount, Relationship, Judgment, Other Prefixes". Archived from the original on 30 April 2021.
- Buck, Carl Darling. Comparative Grammar of Greek and Latin.
- Chrisomalis, Stephen. "Numerical Adjectives, Greek and Latin Number Prefixes". The Phrontistery. Archived from the original on 29 January 2022.
- Sihler, Andrew L. (1995). New Comparative Grammar of Greek and Latin. Oxford University Press. ISBN 0195083458.
- Oxford English Dictionary (2 ed.).
