= List of two-dimensional geometric shapes =

This is a list of two-dimensional geometric shapes in Euclidean and other geometries. For mathematical objects in more dimensions, see list of mathematical shapes. For a broader scope, see list of shapes.

== Generally composed of straight line segments ==
- Angle
- Balbis
- Concave polygon
- Constructible polygon
- Convex polygon
- Cyclic polygon
- Equiangular polygon
- Equilateral polygon
- Penrose tile
- Polyform
- Regular polygon
- Simple polygon
- Tangential polygon

=== Polygons with specific numbers of sides ===
- Monogon - 1 side
- Digon/Bigon - 2 sides
- Triangle – 3 sides
  - Acute triangle
  - Equilateral triangle
  - Heptagonal triangle
  - Isosceles triangle
    - Golden Triangle
  - Obtuse triangle
  - Rational triangle
  - Heronian triangle
    - Pythagorean triangle
    - Isosceles heronian triangle
    - Primitive Heronian triangle
  - Right triangle
    - 30-60-90 triangle
    - Isosceles right triangle
    - Kepler triangle
  - Scalene triangle
- Quadrilateral – 4 sides
  - Cyclic quadrilateral
  - Kite
    - Rectangle
    - Rhomboid
    - Rhombus
    - Square (regular quadrilateral)
  - Tangential quadrilateral
  - Trapezoid
    - Isosceles trapezoid
- Pentagon – 5 sides
- Hexagon – 6 sides
  - Lemoine hexagon
- Heptagon/Septagon – 7 sides
- Octagon – 8 sides
- Nonagon/Enneagon – 9 sides
- Decagon – 10 sides
- Hendecagon – 11 sides
- Dodecagon – 12 sides
- Tridecagon – 13 sides
- Tetradecagon – 14 sides
- Pentadecagon – 15 sides
- Hexadecagon – 16 sides
- Heptadecagon – 17 sides
- Octadecagon – 18 sides
- Enneadecagon – 19 sides
- Icosagon – 20 sides
- Icosikaihenagon - 21 sides
- Icosikaidigon - 22 sides
- Icositrigon - 23 sides
- Icositetragon - 24 sides
- Icosikaipentagon - 25 sides
- Icosikaihexagon - 26 sides
- Icosikaiheptagon - 27 sides
- Icosikaioctagon - 28 sides
- Icosikaienneagon - 29 sides
- Triacontagon - 30 sides
- Tetracontagon - 40 sides
- Tetracontakaienneagon 49 sides
- Pentacontagon - 50 sides
- Hexacontagon - 60 sides
- Heptacontagon - 70 sides
- Heptacontapentagon - 75 sides
- Octacontagon - 80 sides
- Enneacontagon - 90 sides
- Hectogon - 100 sides
- Dihectogon - 200 sides
- Trihectogon - 300 sides
- Tetrahectogon - 400 sides
- Pentahectogon - 500 sides
- Hexahectogon - 600 sides
- Heptahectogon - 700 sides
- Octahectogon - 800 sides
- Enneahectogon - 900 sides
- Chiliagon - 1,000 sides
- Dischiliagon - 2,000 sides
- Trischiliagon - 3,000 sides
- Myriagon - 10,000 sides
- 65537-gon - 65,537 sides
- Megagon - 1,000,000 sides
- Cross - 12 sides
- Star polygon – there are multiple types of stars
  - Pentagram - star polygon with 5 sides
  - Hexagram – star polygon with 6 sides
    - Star of David (example)
  - Heptagram – star polygon with 7 sides
  - Octagram – star polygon with 8 sides
    - Star of Lakshmi (example)
  - Enneagram - star polygon with 9 sides
  - Decagram - star polygon with 10 sides
  - Hendecagram - star polygon with 11 sides
  - Dodecagram - star polygon with 12 sides
- Apeirogon - generalized polygon with countably infinite set of sides

== Curved ==
=== Composed of circular arcs ===
- Annulus
- Arbelos
- Circle
  - Archimedes' twin circles
  - Bankoff circle
  - Circular triangle
    - Reuleaux triangle
  - Circumcircle
  - Disc
  - Incircle and excircles of a triangle
  - Nine-point circle
- Circular sector
- Circular segment
- Crescent
- Heart
- Lens, vesica piscis (fish bladder)
- Lune
- Quatrefoil
- Reuleaux polygon
  - Reuleaux triangle
- Salinon
- Semicircle
- Stadium
- Tomahawk
- Trefoil
- Triquetra

=== Not composed of circular arcs ===
- Archimedean spiral
- Astroid
- Cardioid
- Deltoid
- Ellipse
- Various lemniscates
- Nephroid
- Oval
  - Cartesian oval
  - Cassini oval
  - Oval of Booth
- Superellipse
- Taijitu
- Tomoe
- Magatama

== See also ==
- List of triangle topics
- List of circle topics
- Glossary of shapes with metaphorical names
