= List of polygons =

A pentagon is a five-sided polygon. A regular pentagon has 5 equal edges and 5 equal angles.

In geometry, a polygon is traditionally a plane figure that is bounded by a finite chain of straight line segments closing in a loop to form a closed chain. These segments are called its edges or sides, and the points where two of the edges meet are the polygon's vertices (singular: vertex) or corners.

The word polygon comes from Late Latin polygōnum (a noun), from Greek πολύγωνον (polygōnon/polugōnon), noun use of neuter of πολύγωνος (polygōnos/polugōnos, the masculine adjective), meaning "many-angled". Individual polygons are named (and sometimes classified) according to the number of sides, combining a Greek-derived numerical prefix with the suffix -gon, e.g. pentagon, dodecagon. The triangle, quadrilateral and nonagon are exceptions, although the regular forms trigon, tetragon, and enneagon are sometimes encountered as well.

== Greek numbers ==
Polygons are primarily named by prefixes from Ancient Greek numbers.

English-Greek numbers
English cardinal number	English ordinal number	Greek cardinal number	Greek ordinal number
one	first	heis (fem. mia, neut. hen)	protos
two	second	duo	deuteros
three	third	treis	tritos
four	fourth	tettares	tetartos
five	fifth	pente	pemptos
six	sixth	hex	hektos
seven	seventh	hepta	hebdomos
eight	eighth	okto	ogdoös
nine	ninth	ennea	enatos
ten	tenth	deka	dekatos
eleven	eleventh	hendeka	hendekatos
twelve	twelfth	dodeka	dodekatos
thirteen	thirteenth	triskaideka	dekatotritos
fourteen	fourteenth	tettareskaideka	dekatotetartos
fifteen	fifteenth	pentekaideka	dekatopemptos
sixteen	sixteenth	hekkaideka	dekatohektos
seventeen	seventeenth	heptakaideka	dekatohebdomos
eighteen	eighteenth	oktokaideka	dekatoögdoös
nineteen	nineteenth	enneakaideka	dekatoënatos
twenty	twentieth	eikosi	eikostos
twenty-one	twenty-first	heiskaieikosi	eikostoprotos
twenty-two	twenty-second	duokaieikosi	eikostodeuteros
twenty-three	twenty-third	triskaieikosi	eikostotritos
twenty-four	twenty-fourth	tetterakaieikosi	eikostotetartos
twenty-five	twenty-fifth	pentekaieikosi	eikostopemptos
twenty-six	twenty-sixth	hekkaieikosi	eikostohektos
twenty-seven	twenty-seventh	heptakaieikosi	eikostohebdomos
twenty-eight	twenty-eighth	oktokaieikosi	eikostoögdoös
twenty-nine	twenty-ninth	enneakaieikosi	eikostoënatos
thirty	thirtieth	triakonta	triakostos
thirty-one	thirty-first	heiskaitriakonta	triakostoprotos
forty	fortieth	tessarakonta	tessarakostos
fifty	fiftieth	pentekonta	pentekostos
sixty	sixtieth	hexekonta	hexekostos
seventy	seventieth	hebdomekonta	hebdomekostos
eighty	eightieth	ogdoëkonta	ogdoëkostos
ninety	ninetieth	enenekonta	enenekostos
hundred	hundredth	hekaton	hekatostos
hundred and ten	hundred and tenth	dekakaihekaton	hekatostodekatos
hundred and twenty	hundred and twentieth	ikosikaihekaton	hekatostoikostos
two hundred	two hundredth	diakosioi	diakosiostos
three hundred	three hundredth	triakosioi	triakosiostos
four hundred	four hundredth	tetrakosioi	tetrakosiostos
five hundred	five hundredth	pentakosioi	pentakosiostos
six hundred	six hundredth	hexakosioi	hexakosiostos
seven hundred	seven hundredth	heptakosioi	heptakosiostos
eight hundred	eight hundredth	oktakosioi	oktakosiostos
nine hundred	nine hundredth	enneakosioi	enneakosiostos
One thousand	thousandth	chilioi	chiliostos
two thousand	two thousandth	dischilioi	dischiliostos
three thousand	three thousandth	trischilioi	trischiliostos
four thousand	four thousandth	tetrakischilioi	tetrakischiliostos
five thousand	five thousandth	pentakischilioi	pentakischiliostos
six thousand	six thousandth	hexakischilioi	hexakischiliostos
seven thousand	seven thousandth	heptakischilioi	heptakischiliostos
eight thousand	eight thousandth	oktakischilioi	oktakischiliostos
nine thousand	nine thousandth	enneakischilioi	enneakischiliostos
ten thousand	ten thousandth	myrioi	myriastos
twenty thousand	twenty thousandth	dismyrioi	dismyriastos
thirty thousand	thirty thousandth	trismyrioi	trismyriastos
forty thousand	forty thousandth	tetrakismyrioi	tetrakismyriastos
fifty thousand	fifty thousandth	pentakismyrioi	pentakismyriastos
sixty thousand	sixty thousandth	hexakismyrioi	hexakismyriastos
seventy thousand	seventy thousandth	heptakismyrioi	heptakismyriastos
eighty thousand	eighty thousandth	oktakismyrioi	oktakismyriastos
ninety thousand	ninety thousandth	enneakismyrioi	enneakismyriastos
hundred thousand	hundred thousandth	dekakismyrioi	dekakismyriastos
two hundred thousand	two hundred thousandth	ikosakismyrioi	ikosakismyriastos
three hundred thousand	three hundred thousandth	triakontakismyrioi	triakontakismyriastos
million	millionth	hekatontakismyrioi	hekatontakismyriastos
two million	two millionth	diakosakismyrioi	diakosakismyriastos
three million	three millionth	triakosakismyrioi	triakosakismyriastos
ten million	ten millionth	chiliakismyrioi	chiliakismyriastos
hundred million	hundred millionth	myriakismyrioi	myriakismyriastos

== Systematic polygon names ==
To construct the name of a polygon with more than 20 and fewer than 100 edges, combine the prefixes as follows. The "kai" connector is not included by some authors.

Tens		and	Ones		final suffix
Tens		-kai-	1	-hena-	-gon
20	icosi- (icosa- when used alone)	-kai-	2	-di-	-gon
30	triaconta-	-kai-	3	-tri-	-gon
40	tetraconta-	-kai-	4	-tetra-	-gon
50	pentaconta-	-kai-	5	-penta-	-gon
60	hexaconta-	-kai-	6	-hexa-	-gon
70	heptaconta-	-kai-	7	-hepta-	-gon
80	octaconta-	-kai-	8	-octa-	-gon
90	enneaconta-	-kai-	9	-ennea-	-gon

Extending the system up to 999 is expressed with these prefixes.

Polygon names
Ones		Tens		Twenties		Thirties+		Hundreds	
		10	deca-	20	icosa-	30	triaconta-		
1	hena-	11	hendeca-	21	icosi-hena-	31	triaconta-hena-	100	hecta-
2	di-	12	dodeca-	22	icosi-di-	32	triaconta-di-	200	dihecta-
3	tri-	13	triskaideca-	23	icosi-tri-	33	triaconta-tri-	300	trihecta-
4	tetra-	14	tetrakaideca-	24	icosi-tetra-	40	tetraconta-	400	tetrahecta-
5	penta-	15	pentakaideca-	25	icosi-penta-	50	pentaconta-	500	pentahecta-
6	hexa-	16	hexakaideca-	26	icosi-hexa-	60	hexaconta-	600	hexahecta-
7	hepta-	17	heptakaideca-	27	icosi-hepta-	70	heptaconta-	700	heptahecta-
8	octa-	18	octakaideca-	28	icosi-octa-	80	octaconta-	800	octahecta-
9	ennea-	19	enneakaideca-	29	icosi-ennea-	90	enneaconta-	900	enneahecta-

== List of n-gons by Greek numerical prefixes ==
List of n-gon names
Sides	Names		
1	henagon	monogon	
2	digon	bigon	
3	trigon	triangle	
4	tetragon (Note: In Greek usage, τετράγωνον (romanised: tetragōnon) means square instead of quadrilateral.)	quadrilateral	
5	pentagon		
6	hexagon		
7	heptagon	septagon	
8	octagon		
9	enneagon	nonagon	
10	decagon		
11	hendecagon	undecagon	
12	dodecagon		
13	tridecagon	triskaidecagon	
14	tetradecagon	tetrakaidecagon	
15	pentadecagon	pentakaidecagon	
16	hexadecagon	hexakaidecagon	
17	heptadecagon	heptakaidecagon	septendecagon
18	octadecagon	octakaidecagon	
19	enneadecagon	enneakaidecagon	
20	icosagon		
21	icosikaihenagon	icosihenagon	
22	icosikaidigon	icosidigon	icosadigon
23	icosikaitrigon	icositrigon	icosatrigon
24	icosikaitetragon	icositetragon	icosatetragon
25	icosikaipentagon	icosipentagon	icosapentagon
26	icosikaihexagon	icosihexagon	icosahexagon
27	icosikaiheptagon	icosiheptagon	icosaheptagon
28	icosikaioctagon	icosioctagon	icosaoctagon
29	icosikaienneagon	icosienneagon	icosaenneagon
30	triacontagon		
31	triacontakaihenagon	triacontahenagon	tricontahenagon
32	triacontakaidigon	triacontadigon	tricontadigon
33	triacontakaitrigon	triacontatrigon	tricontatrigon
34	triacontakaitetragon	triacontatetragon	tricontatetragon
35	triacontakaipentagon	triacontapentagon	tricontapentagon
36	triacontakaihexagon	triacontahexagon	tricontahexagon
37	triacontakaiheptagon	triacontaheptagon	tricontaheptagon
38	triacontakaioctagon	triacontaoctagon	tricontaoctagon
39	triacontakaienneagon	triacontaenneagon	tricontaenneagon
40	tetracontagon		tessaracontagon
41	tetracontakaihenagon	tetracontahenagon	tessaracontahenagon
42	tetracontakaidigon	tetracontadigon	tessaracontadigon
43	tetracontakaitrigon	tetracontatrigon	tessaracontatrigon
44	tetracontakaitetragon	tetracontatetragon	tessaracontatetragon
45	tetracontakaipentagon	tetracontapentagon	tessaracontapentagon
46	tetracontakaihexagon	tetracontahexagon	tessaracontahexagon
47	tetracontakaiheptagon	tetracontaheptagon	tessaracontaheptagon
48	tetracontakaioctagon	tetracontaoctagon	tessaracontaoctagon
49	tetracontakaienneagon	tetracontaenneagon	tessaracontaenneagon
50	pentacontagon		pentecontagon
51	pentacontakaihenagon	pentacontahenagon	pentecontahenagon
52	pentacontakaidigon	pentacontadigon	pentecontadigon
53	pentacontakaitrigon	pentacontatrigon	pentecontatrigon
54	pentacontakaitetragon	pentacontatetragon	pentecontatetragon
55	pentacontakaipentagon	pentacontapentagon	pentecontapentagon
56	pentacontakaihexagon	pentacontahexagon	pentecontahexagon
57	pentacontakaiheptagon	pentacontaheptagon	pentecontaheptagon
58	pentacontakaioctagon	pentacontaoctagon	pentecontaoctagon
59	pentacontakaienneagon	pentacontaenneagon	pentecontaenneagon
60	hexacontagon		hexecontagon
61	hexacontakaihenagon	hexacontahenagon	hexecontahenagon
62	hexacontakaidigon	hexacontadigon	hexecontadigon
63	hexacontakaitrigon	hexacontatrigon	hexecontatrigon
64	hexacontakaitetragon	hexacontatetragon	hexecontatetragon
65	hexacontakaipentagon	hexacontapentagon	hexecontapentagon
66	hexacontakaihexagon	hexacontahexagon	hexecontahexagon
67	hexacontakaiheptagon	hexacontaheptagon	hexecontaheptagon
68	hexacontakaioctagon	hexacontaoctagon	hexecontaoctagon
69	hexacontakaienneagon	hexacontaenneagon	hexecontaenneagon
70	heptacontagon		hebdomecontagon
71	heptacontakaihenagon	heptacontahenagon	hebdomecontahenagon
72	heptacontakaidigon	heptacontadigon	hebdomecontadigon
73	heptacontakaitrigon	heptacontatrigon	hebdomecontatrigon
74	heptacontakaitetragon	heptacontatetragon	hebdomecontatetragon
75	heptacontakaipentagon	heptacontapentagon	hebdomecontapentagon
76	heptacontakaihexagon	heptacontahexagon	hebdomecontahexagon
77	heptacontakaiheptagon	heptacontaheptagon	hebdomecontaheptagon
78	heptacontakaioctagon	heptacontaoctagon	hebdomecontaoctagon
79	heptacontakaienneagon	heptacontaenneagon	hebdomecontaenneagon
80	octacontagon		ogdoecontagon
81	octacontakaihenagon	octacontahenagon	ogdoecontahenagon
82	octacontakaidigon	octacontadigon	ogdoecontadigon
83	octacontakaitrigon	octacontatrigon	ogdoecontatrigon
84	octacontakaitetragon	octacontatetragon	ogdoecontatetragon
85	octacontakaipentagon	octacontapentagon	ogdoecontapentagon
86	octacontakaihexagon	octacontahexagon	ogdoecontahexagon
87	octacontakaiheptagon	octacontaheptagon	ogdoecontaheptagon
88	octacontakaioctagon	octacontaoctagon	ogdoecontaoctagon
89	octacontakaienneagon	octacontaenneagon	ogdoecontaenneagon
90	enneacontagon		enenecontagon
91	enneacontakaihenagon	enneacontahenagon	enenecontahenagon
92	enneacontakaidigon	enneacontadigon	enenecontadigon
93	enneacontakaitrigon	enneacontatrigon	enenecontatrigon
94	enneacontakaitetragon	enneacontatetragon	enenecontatetragon
95	enneacontakaipentagon	enneacontapentagon	enenecontapentagon
96	enneacontakaihexagon	enneacontahexagon	enenecontahexagon
97	enneacontakaiheptagon	enneacontaheptagon	enenecontaheptagon
98	enneacontakaioctagon	enneacontaoctagon	enenecontaoctagon
99	enneacontakaienneagon	enneacontaenneagon	enenecontaenneagon
100	hectogon	hecatontagon	hecatogon
120	hecatonicosagon	dodecacontagon	
200	dihectagon		diacosigon
300	trihectagon		triacosigon
400	tetrahectagon		tetracosigon
500	pentahectagon		pentacosigon
600	hexahectagon		hexacosigon
700	heptahectagon		heptacosigon
800	octahectagon		octacosigon
900	enneahectagon		enneacosigon
1000	chiliagon		
2000	dischiliagon	dichiliagon	
3000	trischiliagon	trichiliagon	
4000	tetrakischiliagon	tetrachiliagon	
5000	pentakischiliagon	pentachiliagon	
6000	hexakischiliagon	hexachiliagon	
7000	heptakischiliagon	heptachiliagon	
8000	octakischiliagon	octachiliagon	
9000	enneakischiliagon	enneachilliagon	
10000	myriagon		
20000	dismyriagon	dimyriagon	
30000	trismyriagon	trimyriagon	
40000	tetrakismyriagon	tetramyriagon	
50000	pentakismyriagon	pentamyriagon	
60000	hexakismyriagon	hexamyriagon	
70000	heptakismyriagon	heptamyriagon	
80000	octakismyriagon	octamyriagon	
90000	enneakismyriagon	enneamyriagon	
100000	decakismyriagon	decamyriagon	
200000	icosakismyriagon	icosamyriagon	
300000	triacontakismyriagon	tricontamyriagon	
400000	tetracontakismyriagon	tetracontamyriagon	
500000	pentacontakismyriagon	pentacontamyriagon	
600000	hexacontakismyriagon	hexacontamyriagon	
700000	heptacontakismyriagon	heptacontamyriagon	
800000	octacontakismyriagon	octacontamyriagon	
900000	enneacontakismyriagon	enneacontamyriagon	
1000000	hecatontakismyriagon	megagon	
2000000	diacosakismyriagon	dimegagon	
3000000	triacosakismyriagon	trimegagon	
4000000	tetracosakismyriagon	tetramegagon	
5000000	pentacosakismyriagon	pentamegagon	
6000000	hexacosakismyriagon	hexamegagon	
7000000	heptacosakismyriagon	heptamegagon	
8000000	octacosakismyriagon	octamegagon	
9000000	enneacosakismyriagon	enneamegagon	
10000000	chiliakismyriagon	decamegagon	
20000000	dischiliakismyriagon	icosamegagon	
30000000	trischiliakismyriagon	triacontamegagon	
40000000	tetrakischiliakismyriagon	tetracontamegagon	
50000000	pentakischiliakismyriagon	pentacontamegagon	
60000000	hexakischiliakismyriagon	hexacontamegagon	
70000000	heptakischiliakismyriagon	heptacontamegagon	
80000000	octakischiliakismyriagon	octacontamegagon	
90000000	enneakischiliakismyriagon	enneacontamegagon	
100000000	myriakismyriagon	hectamegagon	
1000000000		gigagon	
1000000000000		teragon	
1000000000000000		petagon	
∞	apeirogon		

== See also ==
- Platonic solid
- Dice
- List of polygons, polyhedra and polytopes
- Circle
- Ellipse
- Shape
