= Decapod (disambiguation) =

A decapod is a member of Decapoda, an order of crustaceans such as lobsters and crabs

Decapod may also refer to:

- 2-10-0, a steam locomotive wheel arrangement often known as Decapod (especially in the United States)
  - Russian locomotive class Ye, nicknamed Russian Decapods
- 0-10-0, a steam locomotive wheel arrangement known as Decapod (in the United Kingdom)
  - GER Class A55, or GER Decapod, an experimental 0-10-0T steam locomotive
- "The Decapod", an episode of 1960s British TV series The Avengers

== See also ==
- Decapodiformes, ten-limbed cephalopods with eight arms and two tentacles
- Decapodian, decapod-like fictional character in the cartoon series Futurama
- Monopod
- Tripod (disambiguation)
- Tetrapod (disambiguation)
- Hexapod (disambiguation)
- Octopus
