= Geometric symbols =

Geometric symbols may refer to:

- Symbols used in the mathematical subfield of geometry - see Glossary of mathematical symbols
- Geometric Shapes (Unicode block)
- Nucleic acid notation § Geometric symbols
- Geometric shapes in general - see Lists of shapes
