= Dyadic =

Dyadic describes the interaction between two things, and may refer to:

- Dyad (sociology), interaction between a pair of individuals
  - The dyadic variation of democratic peace theory
- Dyadic counterpoint, the voice-against-voice conception of polyphony
- People who are not intersex, that is, endosex
- Dyadic kinship terms, kinship terms that express the relationship between individuals as they relate one to the other

== Mathematics ==
- Dyadic relation, synonym for binary relation
- Dyadic function, a function having an arity of two (i.e. having two arguments)
- Dyadic decomposition, a concept in Littlewood–Paley theory
- Dyadic distribution, a type of probability distribution
- Dyadic rational, a rational number whose denominator is a power of 2
- Dyadic transformation, an iterated transformation of the unit interval
- Dyadics, second-order tensors

== See also ==
- Dyad (disambiguation)
