= Speckled hen =

A speckled hen is a chicken of specked plumage.

Speckled hen or Speckled Hen may refer to:

- Old Speckled Hen, an English ale
- Problem of the speckled hen, a problem in the theory of empirical knowledge
- Pet speckled hen, or Guineafowl, an African bird
- "The Speckled Hen", an East Slavic nursery rhyme
- "Speckled Hen", an episode of Russian TV series Muhtar's Return
