= Greek numbers =

Greek numbers may refer to:

- Greek numerals, the system of representing numbers using letters of the Greek alphabet
- Greek numbers, the names and symbols for the numbers 0–10 in the list of numbers in various languages

== See also ==
- Numeral prefix
- Roman numbers
