= Leg =

Weight-bearing and locomotive anatomical structure

- Diagram of an insect leg

Details

Identifiers
- Latin: membrum inferius
- TA98: A01.1.00.031
- TA2: 156
- FMA: 24879

A leg is a weight-bearing and locomotive anatomical structure, usually having a columnar shape. During locomotion, legs function as "extensible struts". The combination of movements at all joints can be modeled as a single, linear element capable of changing length and rotating about an omnidirectional "hip" joint.

As an anatomical animal structure, it is used for locomotion. The distal end is often modified to distribute force (such as a foot). Most animals have an even number of legs.

As a component of furniture, it is used for the economy of materials needed to provide the support for the useful surface, such as the table top or chair seat.

== Terminology ==
- Uniped: one leg, such as clams
- Biped: two legs, such as humans and birds
- Triped: three legs, which typically does not occur naturally in healthy animals
- Quadruped: four legs, such as dogs and horses

Many taxa are characterized by the number of legs:

- Tetrapods have four legs. Squamates of genus Bipes have only two. Caecilians and many squamate lineages convergently lost their legs.
- Panarthropoda: no less than four legs. Velvet worms and some arthropods have more than a dozen legs; a few species possess over one hundred. Despite what their names might suggest, centipedes ("hundred feet") may have fewer than twenty or more than 300 legs, and millipedes ("thousand feet") have fewer than 1,000 legs, but up to 750.

== Components ==
A leg is a structure of gross anatomy, meaning that it is large enough to be seen unaided. The components depend on the animal. In humans and other mammals, a leg includes the bones, muscles, tendons, ligaments, blood vessels, nerves, and skin. In insects, the leg includes most of these things, except that insects have an exoskeleton that replaces the function of both the bones and the skin.

Sometimes the end of the leg, or foot, is considered part of the leg; other times it is considered separate. Similarly, the hip joint or other place where the leg attaches to the main body may be considered separate or part of the leg.

== Tetrapod legs ==
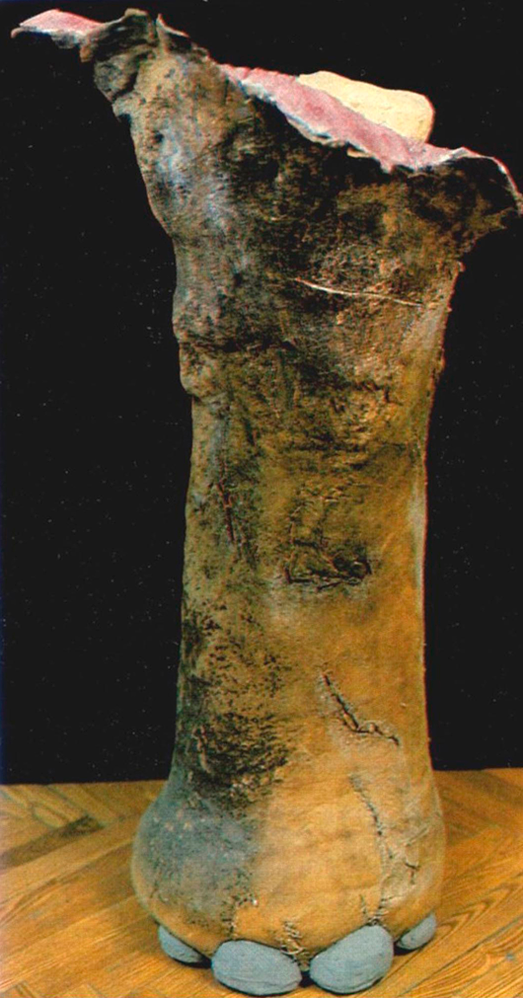
The leg of a woolly mammoth (reconstruction)

In tetrapod anatomy, leg is used to refer to the entire limb. In human medicine, the precise definition refers only to the segment between the knee and the ankle. This lower segment is also called the shank, and the front (anterior) of the segment is called the shin or pretibia.

In bipedal tetrapods, the two lower limbs are referred to as the "legs" and the two upper limbs as "arms" or "wings" as the case may be. In quadrupedal tetrapods, the limbs are generally called forelegs, fore legs or front legs and hindlegs, hind legs or back legs.

== Robotic leg ==
A robotic leg is moved by an actuator, which is a type of motor for moving or controlling a mechanism or system. It is operated by a source of energy, usually in the form of an electric current, hydraulic fluid pressure or pneumatic pressure, and converts that energy into motion.

== Prosthetic leg ==
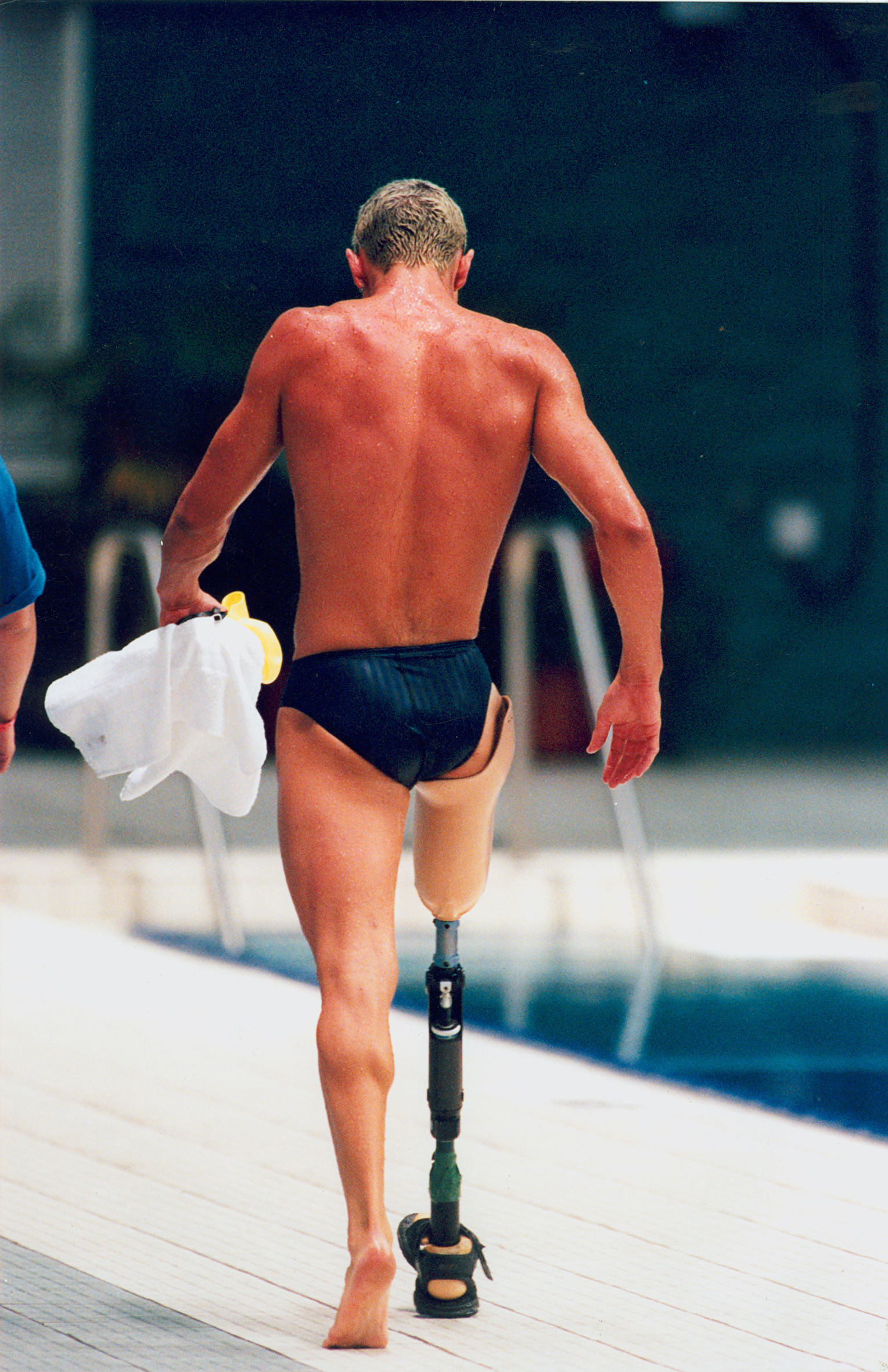
Cameron de Burgh, an Australian Paralympic swimmer, who has a prosthetic leg

A prosthetic leg is an artificial leg that is used to replace one that has been lost.
