= Balbis =

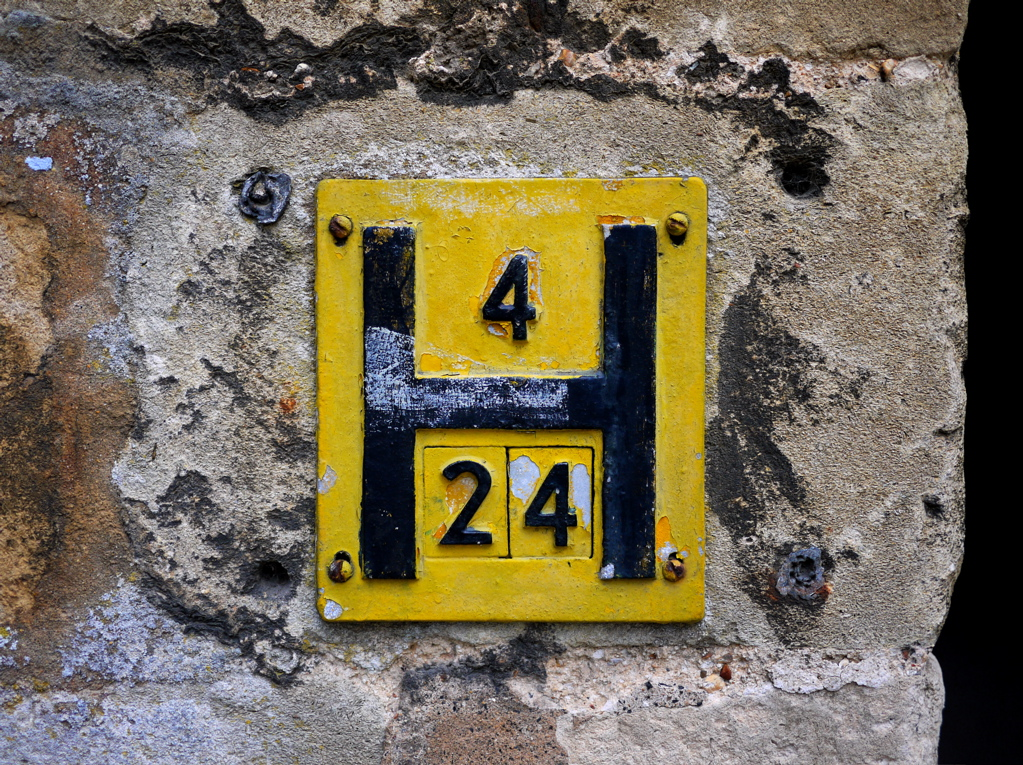
An 'H' balbis in Winchester, Hampshire, England, United Kingdom

In geometry, a balbis is a geometric shape that can be colloquially defined as a single (primary) line that is terminated by a (secondary) line at one endpoint and by a (secondary) line at the other endpoint. The terminating secondary lines are at right angles to the primary line. Its parallel sides are of indefinite lengths and can be infinitely long. The word "balbis" comes from the ancient Greek word βαλβίς, meaning a rope between two posts used to indicate the start and finish of a race.

The most common example of a balbis is the capital letter 'H', the eighth letter in the ISO basic Latin alphabet. It can also be seen in, for example, rugby posts and old-fashioned television antenna.

Another type of balbis is the rectangular balbis, that may be loosely described as a rectangle with one side missing. A rectangular balbis was used in the Olympic Games, as a throwing area and is described by Philostratus II.

In his book about the balbis (see References below), the Rev. P. H. Francis describes the balbis as "the commonest geometrical figure, more in evidence than the triangle, circle, ellipse, or other geometrical figure that has been studied from ancient times" and goes on to state that it "was known to but not studied by the ancient Greeks; and this geometrical figure has been neglected." His memorial illustrates a balbis and can be seen in St. Mary's Church, Stoughton, West Sussex.
