= Precision polygon =

Precision polygons are basic standards for angle measurement, which are used and calibrated by the national standards laboratories in particular. Multifaced polygons are used for calibration of rotary tables and dividing heads. Any number of faces can be produced.

The minimum size of the reflecting face should be approx. 13 mm x 13 mm. Thus maximum number of faces can be 72, corresponding to an included angle of 5°. Steel polygons are made of high grade steel, hardened and subjected to a suitable heat treatment for stabilisation and the sharp corners are chamfered or rounded off suitably. The reflecting faces are lapped flat to within 0.0001 mm.

According to IS: 6987–1973, these are divided into three types, 1, 2 and 3, with working faces between 5—20, 21—40 and 41–72. The top and supporting surface are lightly lapped and legibly marked. In order for the result of the calibration to be recorded and subsequently applied, the face of the polygon is identified. Each face is identified by engraving on the top surface, the nominal angles with the face and a datum face. The faces may be identified with a series of numbers starting from 1 if nominal angle is not a whole number of degrees. Around 4 holes (plain for type 1 and threaded for types 2 and 3) are provided for clamping purposes. The dimension of polygon between the top and supporting surfaces is 75,150 and 300 mm for types 1, 2 and 3 respectively. The top and supporting surfaces are made flat and parallel to accuracies of 0.0025,0.005 and 0.007 mm, 0.0035,0.005 and 0.04 mm for types 1, 2 and 3 respectively and departure from flatness is permissible only in concave direction. All faces are made square to the bottom supporting surface to an accuracy of 2.5 \xm over the thickness of the polygon. The error in angle between any worke and the datum face and between any two adjacent working faces shall not be more than 10 seconds of arc.
