= Monadic =

Monadic may refer to:

- Monadic, a relation or function having an arity of one in logic, mathematics, and computer science
- Monadic, an adjunction if and only if it is equivalent to the adjunction given by the Eilenberg–Moore algebras of its associated monad, in category theory
- Monadic, in computer programming, a feature, type, or function related to a monad (functional programming)
- Monadic or univalent, a chemical valence
- Monadic, in theology, a religion or philosophy possessing a concept of a divine Monad

== See also ==
- Monadic predicate calculus, in logic
- Monad (disambiguation)
