= Tripod (disambiguation) =

A tripod is a three-legged support device.

Tripod may also refer to:

== Three-legged devices ==
- Tripod (foundation), a type of structural foundation for offshore wind turbines
- Tripod (gun), a type of weapon mount
- Tripod (laboratory), a platform used to support laboratory equipment
- Tripod (photography), a stand used to stabilize and elevate photographic equipment
- Tripod (surveying), a stand used to support surveying instruments
- Sacrificial tripod, a piece of religious furniture used for offerings
- Tripod joints, a type of constant-velocity joint, used at the inboard end of car driveshafts

== Arts and entertainment ==
- TriPod, an American rock trio
- Tripod (band), an Australian musical comedy act
- Tripod, an informal name for the self-titled album by Alice in Chains, 1995
- Fighting machine (The War of the Worlds), a fictional alien vehicle in The War of the Worlds which are sometimes called Tripods.
- The Tripods, a novel series by John Christopher
  - The Tripods (TV series), a 1984–1985 adaptation of the novels

== Other uses ==
- Tripod (Neocatechumanate precept), a precept of the Neocatechumenal Way, an association within the Catholic Church
- Tripod (web hosting), a web hosting service
- Tripod Island, Antarctica
- Tripod Rock, a balancing rock in Kinnelon, New Jersey, US

== See also ==
- Tripod fish (disambiguation)
- Triangle, a polygon with three edges
- Tricorne, a style of hat
- Triskelion, a motif consisting of a triple spiral
- Tetrapod (disambiguation)
