= Monad =

Monad may refer to:

== Philosophy and religion ==
- Monad (philosophy), a term meaning "unit"
  - Monism, the concept of "one essence" in the metaphysical and theological theory
  - Monad (Gnosticism), the most primal aspect of God in Gnosticism
- Great Monad, an older name for the taijitu symbol

== Mathematics, science and technology ==
- Monad (biology), a historical term for a simple unicellular organism
- Monad (category theory), a construction in category theory
- Monad (functional programming), constructs that capture various notions of computation
- Monad (homological algebra), a 3-term complex
- Monad (nonstandard analysis), the set of points infinitesimally close to a given point

== Media and arts ==
=== Books ===
- Monadologia Physica, by Immanuel Kant
- La Monadologie, by Gottfried Leibniz, about a basic unit of perceptual reality
- Monas Hieroglyphica, 1564, by John Dee, describing a symbol of his own invention

=== Fictional entities ===
- Monads, megastructures in Robert Silverberg's 1971 novel The World Inside
- Monad Proxy, a character in the 2006 anime series Ergo Proxy
- John Monad, the title character of the 2007 television series John from Cincinnati
- Monad/Monado, a sword in the 2010 videogame Xenoblade Chronicles

=== Other uses in media and arts ===
- Monad (music), a single note or pitch

== Organizations and brands ==
- Monad University, in Hapur, Uttar Pradesh, India
- Monad shell, the code name for the PowerShell command line interface for Microsoft Windows

== Other uses ==
- The emblem of the technocracy movement

== See also ==
- Dyad (disambiguation)
- Monade
- Monadic (disambiguation)
- Monoid, in abstract algebra
- , for titles starting "Monad" or "Monadic"
