= Tetrapod (disambiguation) =

A tetrapod is a four-limbed animal of the superclass Tetrapoda.

Tetrapod may also refer to:

- Tetrapod (structure), a type of structure used to prevent erosion in coastal engineering
- Tetrapod (table) or analogion, a lectern or slanted stand used to display the Gospel Book in churches

== See also ==
- Tetrapodomorpha, a clade of vertebrates consisting of tetrapods and their closest relatives
- Tripod (disambiguation)
