= Tripedalism =

Locomotion by use of three limbs

Tripedalism (from the Latin tri = three + ped = foot) is locomotion by the use of three limbs. Real-world tripedalism is rare, in contrast to the common bipedalism of two-legged animals and quadrupedalism of four-legged animals. Bilateral symmetry seems to have become entrenched very early in evolution, appearing even before appendages like legs, fins or flippers had evolved.

== In nature ==
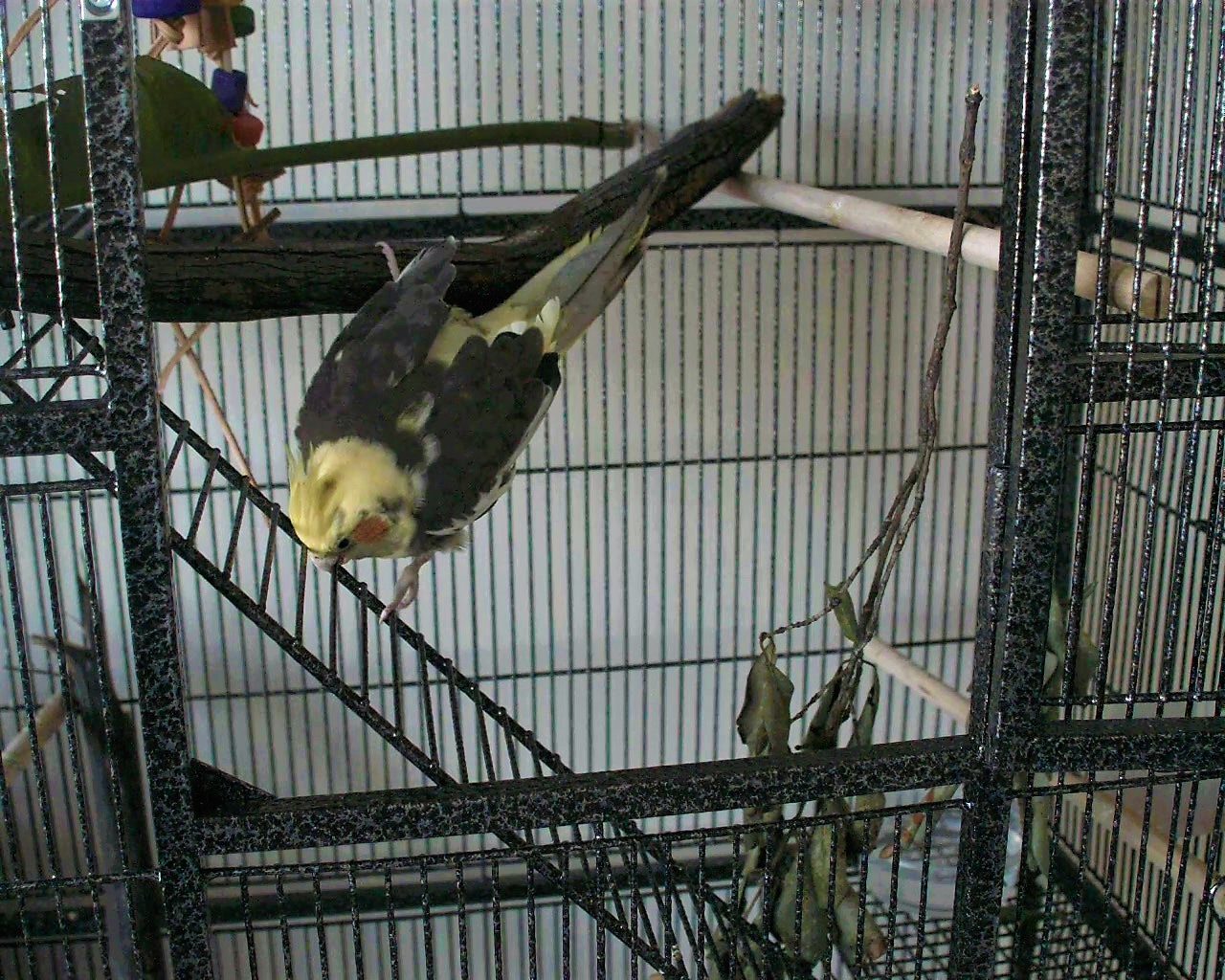
Male cockatiel climbing from a log to a ladder using his beak

Parrots (birds of the order Psittaciformes) are the only known creatures to naturally use tripedal forms of locomotion, as they use their heads as a third limb when climbing. They generate propulsive and tangential forces equal to or greater than those of forelimbs in non-human primates when climbing vertical surfaces.

Non-standard tripedal gaits are also observed in primates when they use one limb to grasp an object.

== Quadrupedal amputees and mutations ==
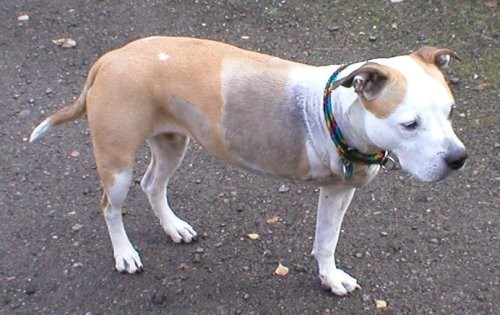
Health consequences vary depending on which limb was lost, with hind legs being less consequential of a loss than front legs in quadrupeds like dogs

There are some three-legged creatures in the world today, namely four-legged animals (such as pet dogs and cats) which have had one limb amputated. Animals made into tripeds through amputation may suffer from long term health consequences; these issues include osteoarthritis and spinal deformity and are largely a result of disruption to natural locomotion cycles and symmetry.

There are also cases of mutations or birth abnormalities in animals (including humans) which have resulted in three legs. With humans, a third limb may arise from the surgical bisection of conjoined or parasitic twins. Such conditions will often result in a limb with reduced or limited mobility. In rarer cases such as with Frank Lentini, a third limb may be usable in activities requiring moderate motor function, such as kicking a football, but will still lack the fine motor skills of the natural limbs.

== See also ==
- Bipedalism
- Quadrupedalism
- Terrestrial locomotion
- Tetrapod
- Three-legged crow – Mythical bird
- Uniped
