= Dyadic distribution =

A dyadic (or 2-adic) distribution is a specific type of discrete probability distribution that is of some theoretical importance in data compression.

== Definition ==
A dyadic distribution is a probability distribution whose probability mass function is

$$f(i) = 2^{-x_i}$$

where $x_i$ is some whole number.

It is possible to find a binary code defined on this distribution, which has an average code length that is equal to the entropy.
