= Problem of the speckled hen =

Type of epistemological problem

In the theory of empirical knowledge, the problem of the speckled hen is whether a single immediate observation of a speckled hen provides a certain knowledge of the number of speckles observed. Clearly, this is not an isolated example, and therefore it is of fundamental nature. Philosophically, this problem probes the limits of knowledge by acquaintance: one is unable to know with certainty the existence of determinate things in one's experience merely by the virtue of the experience.

Roderick Chisholm attributes it to Gilbert Ryle suggesting to A. J. Ayer. It is viewed as a criticism of the view expressed by C. I. Lewis that there can never be "positive bafflement in the presence of the immediate, because there is here no question which fails to find an answer."

Joseph Heath remarks that this problem is one of the "descendants of Descartes's 'chiliagon' argument in the sixth of his Meditations".

A. J. Ayer suggested that if we are unable to enumerate speckles accurately, then it is incorrect to suggest that the "sense-data" provides a definite number of speckles despite the fact that the hen does have a definite number of them, clearly outlined. In Ayers' words, speckles are enumerable only if in fact they have been enumerated.

A number of philosophers analyzed the merits of this proposition. Chisholm concludes that the problem of the speckled hen emphasizes the fact that there are basic propositions (synthetic propositions which do not refer beyond the content of the immediate experience) that are necessarily imprecise.
