= Dyad =

Dyad or dyade may refer to:

== Arts and entertainment ==
- Dyad (music), a set of two notes or pitches
- Dyad (novel), by Michael Brodsky, 1989
- Dyad (video game), 2012
- Dyad 1909 and Dyad 1929, ballets by Wayne McGregor
- Dyad Institute, a fictional biotech corporation in the Canadian TV series Orphan Black

== Other uses ==
- Dyad (biology), a pair of sister chromatids
- Dyad (philosophy), used by the Pythagoreans for the number two, representing "twoness" or "otherness"
- Dyad (sociology), a group of two people
- Grizzled Young Veterans, also known as The Dyad, a British professional wrestling tag team

== See also ==
- Dyadic (disambiguation)
- Diad, in cell biology
- Dryad (disambiguation)
- Dyad pedagogy, a goal-directed teaching method
- Dyad symmetry, in genetics
- Monad (disambiguation)
- Triad (disambiguation) ("group of 3")
