= Hexapod =

Hexapod may refer to:

Things with six limbs, e.g. a hexapod chair would have six not the traditional four limbs

== Biology ==
- Hexapoda, a subphylum of arthropods including the insects
- Hexapodidae, a family of crabs

== Technology ==
- Hexapod (robotics), a mechanical vehicle that walks on six legs
- Stewart platform, a machine platform supported by six struts, used in robotics
- Hexapod-Telescope, a telescope in Chile mounted on a Stewart platform chassis frame

== See also ==
- Tetrapod
- Octopod
