= Unipedalism =

Person or creature with one foot and one leg

A uniped (from Latin uni- "one" and ped- "foot") is a person or creature with only one foot and one leg, as contrasted with a biped (two legs) and a quadruped (four legs). Moving using only one leg is known as unipedal movement. Many bivalvia and nearly all gastropoda molluscs have evolved only one foot. Through accidents (i.e. amputation) or birth abnormalities it is also possible for an animal, including humans, to end up with only a single leg.

== In fiction and mythology ==
One major study of mythological unipeds is Teresa Pàroli (2009): "How many are the unipeds' feet? Their tracks in texts and sources", in Analecta Septentrionalia: Beiträge zur nordgermanischen Kultur- und Literaturgeschichte, ed. by Wilhelm Heizmann, Klaus Böldl and Heinrich Beck (Berlin/London/New York: De Gruyter), pp. 281–327.

- In the Saga of Erik the Red, a native of Vinland who is described as being one-legged kills one of Eric's men (his brother). In the children's fiction book They Came on Viking Ships by Jackie French, a uniped is a one-legged Norse mythical creature that lived in the south of Vinland during the time of the expedition of Freydís Eiríksdóttir.
- The sciapod was another mythical one-legged humanoid.
- In Japanese mythology and folklore, some yōkai such as the karakasa-obake and the ippon-datara have one leg.
- In the Narnia book The Voyage of the Dawn Treader by C. S. Lewis, the heroes meet the "Dufflepuds". These are two-legged dwarfs who have been rendered one-legged by their master, a wizard. He did this to force them to use the water from the stream next to their food garden, rather than walking miles to get the water.
- In Brazilian folklore, there is a mythical humanoid uniped called "Saci" who appears in several tales and is associated with dustdevils. Colombian folklore has a female version of this monster, the "Patasola".
- In Mayan mythology, God K and his equivalents are represented with one leg. One of these equivalents is the K'iche' Maya storm deity Huracan, whose name means "one-leg".
- In the Indian epic Mahabharata, there is a mention of a Southern Indian tribe of humans named 'Ekapada' (literally 'one-footed') living, which Sahadeva conquers.
- In Hindu culture, there is a form of the god Shiva known as Ekapada.
