= Lists of shapes =

List of lists

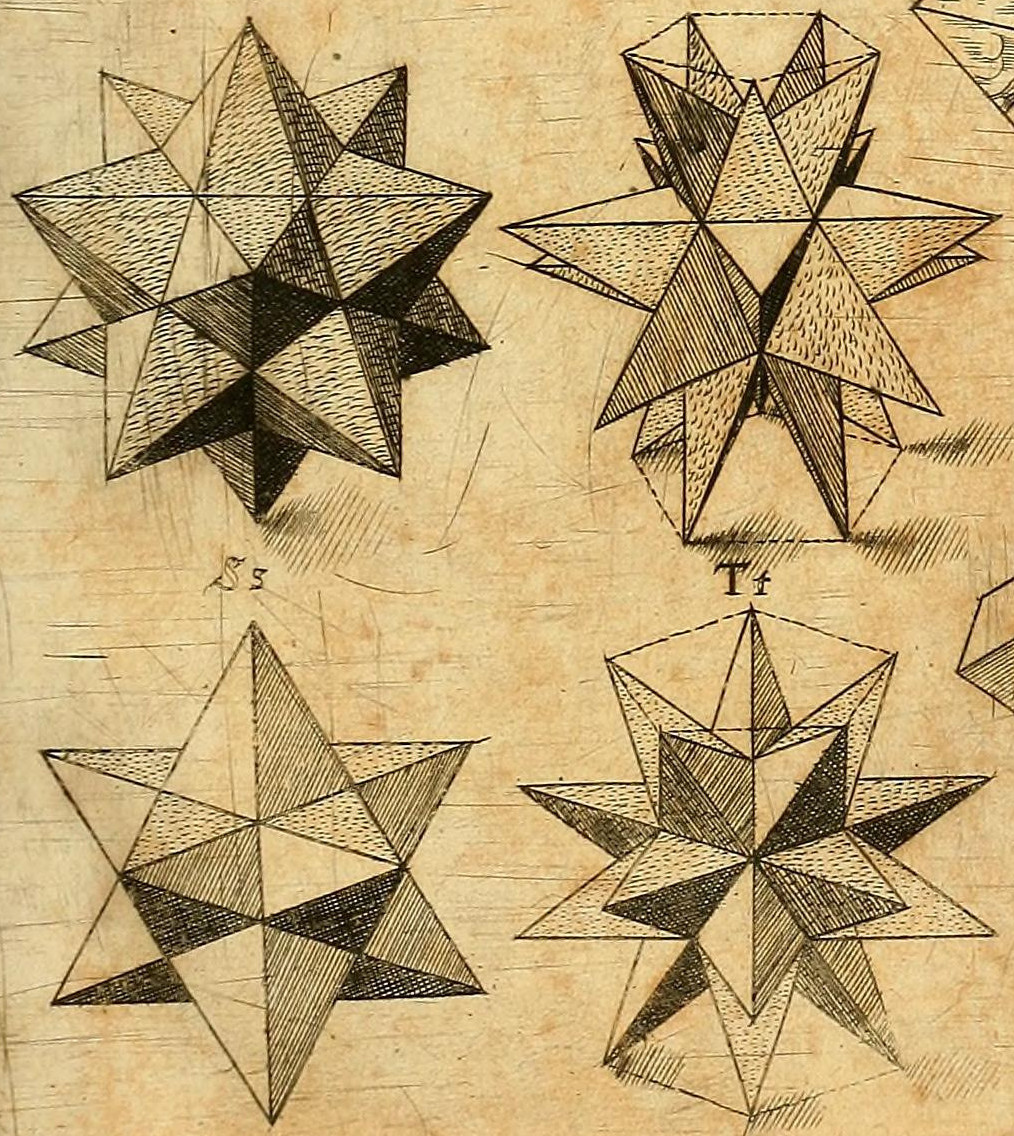
Small and great stellated dodecahedron from Harmonices Mundi by Johannes Kepler

Lists of shapes cover different types of geometric shape and related topics. They include mathematics topics and other lists of shapes, such as shapes used by drawing or teaching tools.

== Mathematics ==
- List of mathematical shapes
- List of two-dimensional geometric shapes
  - List of triangle topics
  - List of circle topics
- List of curves
- List of surfaces
- List of polygons, polyhedra and polytopes
  - List of regular polytopes and compounds

== Elsewhere ==
- Solid geometry, including table of major three-dimensional shapes
- Box-drawing character
- Cuisenaire rods (learning aid)
- Geometric shape
- Geometric Shapes (Unicode block)
- Glossary of shapes with metaphorical names
- List of symbols
- Pattern Blocks (learning aid)
