= Megagon =

Polygon with 1 million edges

Regular megagon
- A regular megagon
- Type: Regular polygon
- Edges and vertices: 1000000
- Schläfli symbol: {1000000}, t{500000}, tt{250000}, ttt{125000}, tttt{62500}, ttttt{31250}, tttttt{15625}
- Symmetry group: Dihedral (D_{1000000}), order 2×1000000
- Internal angle (degrees): 179.99964°
- Properties: Convex, cyclic, equilateral, isogonal, isotoxal
- Dual polygon: Self

A megagon or 1,000,000-gon (million-gon) is a circle-like polygon with one million sides (mega-, from the Greek μέγας, meaning "great", being a unit prefix denoting a factor of one million).

== Regular megagon ==
A regular megagon is represented by the Schläfli symbol {1,000,000} and can be constructed as a truncated 500,000-gon, t{500,000}, a twice-truncated 250,000-gon, tt{250,000}, a thrice-truncated 125,000-gon, ttt{125,000}, or a four-fold-truncated 62,500-gon, tttt{62,500}, a five-fold-truncated 31,250-gon, ttttt{31,250}, or a six-fold-truncated 15,625-gon, tttttt{15,625}.

A regular megagon has an interior angle of 179°59'58.704" or 3.14158637 radians. The area of a regular megagon with sides of length a is given by

$$A = 250,000 \ a^2 \cot \frac{\pi}{1,000,000}.$$

The perimeter of a regular megagon inscribed in the unit circle is:

$$2,000,000 \ \sin\frac{\pi}{1,000,000},$$

which is exceedingly close to 2π. In fact, for a circle the size of the Earth's equator, with a circumference of 40,075 kilometres, one edge of a megagon inscribed in such a circle would be slightly over 40 meters long. The difference between the perimeter of the inscribed megagon and the circumference of this circle comes to less than 1/16 millimeters.

Because 1,000,000 = 2^{6} × 5^{6}, the number of sides is not a product of distinct Fermat primes and a power of two. Thus the regular megagon is not a constructible polygon. Indeed, it is not even constructible with the use of an angle trisector, as the number of sides is neither a product of distinct Pierpont primes, nor a product of powers of two and three.

== Philosophical application ==
Like René Descartes's example of the chiliagon, the million-sided polygon has been used as an illustration of a well-defined concept that cannot be visualised.

The megagon is also used as an illustration of the convergence of regular polygons to a circle.

== Symmetry ==
The regular megagon has Dih_{1,000,000} dihedral symmetry, order 2,000,000, represented by 1,000,000 lines of reflection. There are 49 dihedral groups which can embed as subgroups of Dih_{1,000,000}, corresponding to the 49 factors of 1,000,000 (these are the dihedral groups Dih_{2^x 5^y} for 0 ≤ x, y ≤ 6). Each of these dihedral groups Dih_{n} also has a subgroup Z_{n} of cyclic symmetries.

John Conway labeled these lower symmetries with a letter and order of the symmetry follows the letter. r2000000 represents full symmetry and a1 labels no symmetry. He gives d (diagonal) with mirror lines through vertices, p with mirror lines through edges (perpendicular), i with mirror lines through both vertices and edges, and g for rotational symmetry.

These lower symmetries allows degrees of freedom in defining irregular megagons. Only the g1000000 subgroup has no degrees of freedom but can be seen as directed edges.

== Megagram ==
A megagram is a million-sided star polygon. There are 199,999 regular forms (Note: 199,999 = 500,000 cases − 1 (convex) − 100,000 (multiples of 5) − 250,000 (multiples of 2) + 50,000 (multiples of 2 and 5)) given by Schläfli symbols of the form {1000000/n}, where n is an integer between 2 and 500,000 that is coprime to 1,000,000. There are also 300,000 regular star figures in the remaining cases.

== See also ==
- Chiliagon
- Myriagon
