= Myriagon =

Polygon with 10000 edges

Regular myriagon
- A regular myriagon
- Type: Regular polygon
- Edges and vertices: 10000
- Schläfli symbol: {10000}, t{5000}, tt{2500}, ttt{1250}, tttt{625}
- Symmetry group: Dihedral (D_{10000}), order 2×10000
- Internal angle (degrees): 179.964°
- Properties: Convex, cyclic, equilateral, isogonal, isotoxal
- Dual polygon: Self

In geometry, a myriagon or 10000-gon is a polygon with 10000 sides. Several philosophers have used the regular myriagon to illustrate issues regarding thought.

== Regular myriagon ==
A regular myriagon is represented by Schläfli symbol {10,000} and can be constructed as a truncated 5000-gon, t{5000}, or a twice-truncated 2500-gon, tt{2500}, or a thrice-truncated 1250-gon, ttt{1250}, or a four-fold-truncated 625-gon, tttt{625}.

The measure of each internal angle in a regular myriagon is 179.964°. The area of a regular myriagon with sides of length a is given by

$$A = 2500a^2 \cot \frac{\pi}{10000}$$

The result differs from the area of its circumscribed circle by up to 400 parts per billion.

Because 10,000 = 2^{4} × 5^{4}, the number of sides is neither a product of distinct Fermat primes nor a power of two. Thus the regular myriagon is not a constructible polygon. Indeed, it is not even constructible with the use of an angle trisector, as the number of sides is neither a product of distinct Pierpont primes, nor a product of powers of two and three.

== Symmetry ==
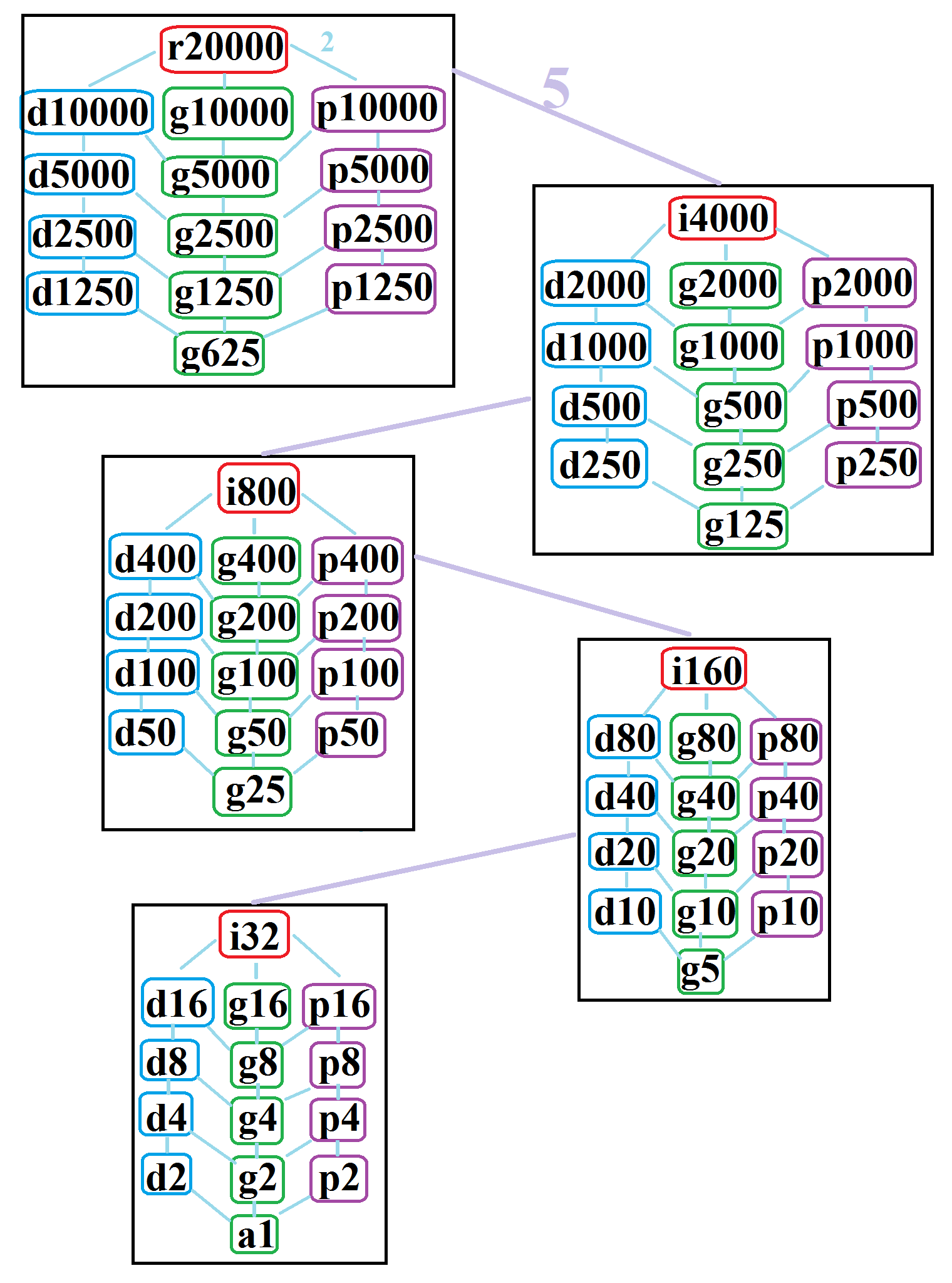
The symmetries of a regular myriagon. Light blue lines show subgroups of index 2. The 5 boxed subgraphs are positionally related by index 5 subgroups.

The regular myriagon has Dih_{10000} dihedral symmetry, order 20000, represented by 10000 lines of reflection. Dih_{10000} has 24 dihedral subgroups: (Dih_{5000}, Dih_{2500}, Dih_{1250}, Dih_{625}), (Dih_{2000}, Dih_{1000}, Dih_{500}, Dih_{250}, Dih_{125}), (Dih_{400}, Dih_{200}, Dih_{100}, Dih_{50}, Dih_{25}), (Dih_{80}, Dih_{40}, Dih_{20}, Dih_{10}, Dih_{5}), and (Dih_{16}, Dih_{8}, Dih_{4}, Dih_{2}, Dih_{1}). It also has 25 more cyclic symmetries as subgroups: (Z_{10000}, Z_{5000}, Z_{2500}, Z_{1250}, Z_{625}), (Z_{2000}, Z_{1000}, Z_{500}, Z_{250}, Z_{125}), (Z_{400}, Z_{200}, Z_{100}, Z_{50}, Z_{25}), (Z_{80}, Z_{40}, Z_{20}, Z_{10}), and (Z_{16}, Z_{8}, Z_{4}, Z_{2}, Z_{1}), with Z_{n} representing π/n radian rotational symmetry.

John Conway labels these lower symmetries with a letter and order of the symmetry follows the letter. r20000 represents full symmetry, and a1 labels no symmetry. He gives d (diagonal) with mirror lines through vertices, p with mirror lines through edges (perpendicular), i with mirror lines through both vertices and edges, and g for rotational symmetry.

These lower symmetries allows degrees of freedom in defining irregular myriagons. Only the g10000 subgroup has no degrees of freedom but can be seen as directed edges.

== Myriagram ==
A myriagram is a 10,000-sided star polygon. There are 1999 regular forms (Note: 5000 cases − 1 (convex) − 1,000 (multiples of 5) − 2,500 (multiples of 2) + 500 (multiples of 2 and 5)) given by Schläfli symbols of the form {10000/n}, where n is an integer between 2 and 5,000 that is coprime to 10,000. There are also 3000 regular star figures in the remaining cases.

== In popular culture ==
In the novella Flatland, the Chief Circle is assumed to have ten thousand sides, making him not a circle, but a myriagon.

== See also ==
- Chiliagon
- Megagon
