= Chiliagon =

Polygon with 1000 edges

Regular chiliagon
- A regular chiliagon
- Type: Regular polygon
- Edges and vertices: 1000
- Schläfli symbol: {1000}, t{500}, tt{250}, ttt{125}
- Symmetry group: Dihedral (D_{1000}), order 2×1000
- Internal angle (degrees): 179.64°
- Properties: Convex, cyclic, equilateral, isogonal, isotoxal
- Dual polygon: Self

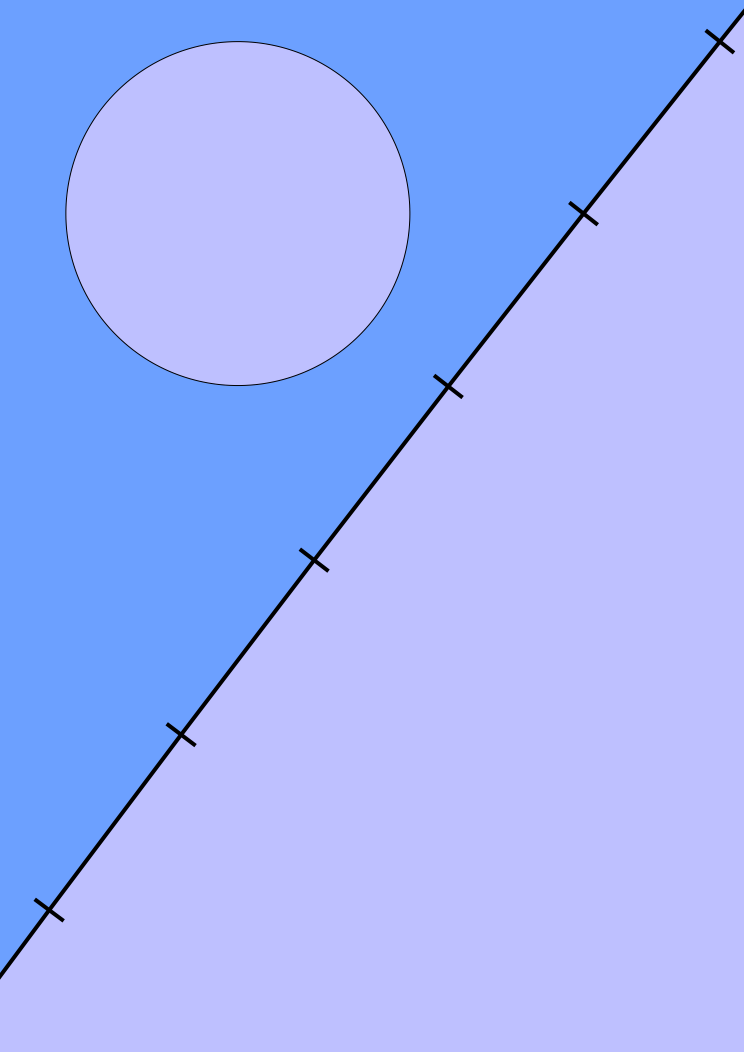
A whole regular chiliagon is not visually discernible from a circle. The lower section is a portion of a regular chiliagon, 200 times as large as the smaller one, with the vertices highlighted.

In geometry, a chiliagon (/ˈkɪliəɡɒn/) or 1,000-gon is a polygon with 1,000 sides. Philosophers have used chiliagons to illustrate ideas about the nature and workings of thought, meaning, and mental representation.

== Regular chiliagon ==
A regular chiliagon is represented by Schläfli symbol {1,000} and can be constructed as a truncated 500-gon, t{500}, or a twice-truncated 250-gon, tt{250}, or a thrice-truncated 125-gon, ttt{125}.

The measure of each internal angle in a regular chiliagon is 179°38'24" or $\frac{499\pi}{500}$rad. The area of a regular chiliagon with sides of length a is given by

$$A = 250a^2 \cot \frac{\pi}{1000} \simeq 79577.2\,a^2$$

This result differs from the area of its circumscribed circle by less than 4 parts per million.

Because 1,000 = 2^{3} × 5^{3}, the number of sides is neither a product of distinct Fermat primes nor a power of two. Thus the regular chiliagon is not a constructible polygon. Indeed, it is not even constructible with the use of an angle trisector, as the number of sides is neither a product of distinct Pierpont primes, nor a product of powers of two and three. Therefore, construction of a chiliagon requires other techniques such as the quadratrix of Hippias, Archimedean spiral, or other auxiliary curves. For example, a 9° angle can first be constructed with compass and straightedge, which can then be quintisected (divided into five equal parts) twice using an auxiliary curve to produce the 21'36" internal angle required.

== Philosophical application ==
René Descartes uses the chiliagon as an example in his Sixth Meditation to demonstrate the difference between pure intellection and imagination. He says that, when one thinks of a chiliagon, he "does not imagine the thousand sides or see them as if they were present" before him – as he does when one imagines a triangle, for example. The imagination constructs a "confused representation," which is no different from that which it constructs of a myriagon (a polygon with ten thousand sides). However, he does clearly understand what a chiliagon is, just as he understands what a triangle is, and he is able to distinguish it from a myriagon. Therefore, the intellect is not dependent on imagination, Descartes claims, as it is able to entertain clear and distinct ideas when imagination is unable to. Philosopher Pierre Gassendi, a contemporary of Descartes, was critical of this interpretation, believing that while Descartes could imagine a chiliagon, he could not understand it: one could "perceive that the word 'chiliagon' signifies a figure with a thousand angles [but] that is just the meaning of the term, and it does not follow that you understand the thousand angles of the figure any better than you imagine them."

The example of a chiliagon is also referenced by other philosophers. David Hume points out that it is "impossible for the eye to determine the angles of a chiliagon to be equal to 1.996 right angles, or make any conjecture, that approaches this proportion." Gottfried Leibniz comments on a use of the chiliagon by John Locke, noting that one can have an idea of the polygon without having an image of it, and thus distinguishing ideas from images. Immanuel Kant refers instead to the enneacontahexagon (96-gon), but responds to the same question raised by Descartes.

Henri Poincaré uses the chiliagon as evidence that "intuition is not necessarily founded on the evidence of the senses" because "we can not represent to ourselves a chiliagon, and yet we reason by intuition on polygons in general, which include the chiliagon as a particular case."

Inspired by Descartes's chiliagon example, Roderick Chisholm and other 20th-century philosophers have used similar examples to make similar points. Chisholm's "speckled hen", which need not have a determinate number of speckles to be successfully imagined, is perhaps the most famous of these.

== Symmetry ==
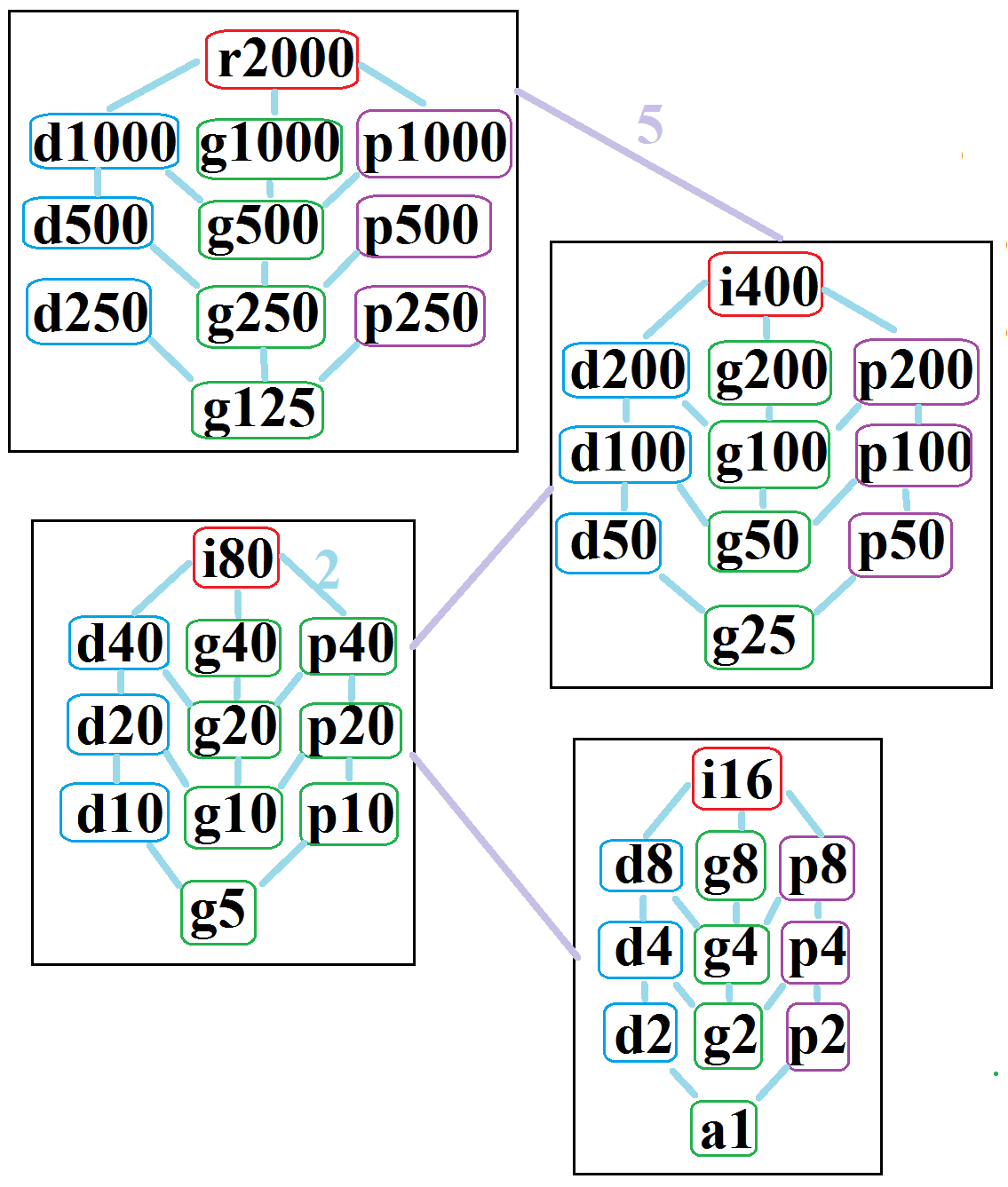
The symmetries of a regular chiliagon. Light blue lines show subgroups of index 2. The 4 boxed subgraphs are positionally related by index 5 subgroups.

The regular chiliagon has Dih_{1000} dihedral symmetry, order 2000, represented by 1,000 lines of reflection. Dih_{1000} has 15 dihedral subgroups: Dih_{500}, Dih_{250}, Dih_{125}, Dih_{200}, Dih_{100}, Dih_{50}, Dih_{25}, Dih_{40}, Dih_{20}, Dih_{10}, Dih_{5}, Dih_{8}, Dih_{4}, Dih_{2}, and Dih_{1}. It also has 16 more cyclic symmetries as subgroups: Z_{1000}, Z_{500}, Z_{250}, Z_{125}, Z_{200}, Z_{100}, Z_{50}, Z_{25}, Z_{40}, Z_{20}, Z_{10}, Z_{5}, Z_{8}, Z_{4}, Z_{2}, and Z_{1}, with Z_{n} representing π/n radian rotational symmetry.

John Conway labels these lower symmetries with a letter and order of the symmetry follows the letter. He gives d (diagonal) with mirror lines through vertices, p with mirror lines through edges (perpendicular), i with mirror lines through both vertices and edges, and g for rotational symmetry. a1 labels no symmetry.

These lower symmetries allow degrees of freedom in defining irregular chiliagons. Only the g1000 subgroup has no degrees of freedom but can be seen as directed edges.

== Chiliagram ==
A chiliagram is a 1,000-sided star polygon. There are 199 regular forms (Note: 199 = 500 cases − 1 (convex) − 100 (multiples of 5) − 250 (multiples of 2) + 50 (multiples of 2 and 5)) given by Schläfli symbols of the form {1000/n}, where n is an integer between 2 and 500 that is coprime to 1,000. There are also 300 regular star figures in the remaining cases.

For example, the regular {1000/499} star polygon is constructed by 1000 nearly radial edges. Each star vertex has an internal angle of 0.36 degrees. (Note: 0.36=180(1-2/(1000/499))=180(1-998/1000)=180(2/1000)=180/500)

{1000/499}
Central area with moiré patterns

== See also ==
- Myriagon
- Megagon
- Philosophy of Mind
- Philosophy of Language
