= Dodecagram =

Star polygon with 12 vertices

Regular dodecagram
- A regular dodecagram
- Type: Regular star polygon
- Edges and vertices: 12
- Schläfli symbol: {12/5} t{6/5}
- Symmetry group: Dihedral (D_{12})
- Internal angle (degrees): 30°
- Properties: star, cyclic, equilateral, isogonal, isotoxal
- Dual polygon: self

In geometry, a dodecagram (from Greek δώδεκα (dṓdeka) 'twelve' and γραμμῆς (grammēs) 'line') is a star polygon or compound with 12 vertices. There is one regular dodecagram polygon (with Schläfli symbol {12/5} and a turning number of 5). There are also 4 regular compounds {12/2}, {12/3}, {12/4}, and {12/6}.

== Regular dodecagram ==
There is one regular form: {12/5}, containing 12 vertices, with a turning number of 5. A regular dodecagram has the same vertex arrangement as a regular dodecagon, which may be regarded as {12/1}.

=== Dodecagrams as regular compounds ===
There are four regular compound dodecagram star figures: {12/2}=2{6}, {12/3}=3{4}, {12/4}=4{3}, and {12/6}=6{2}. The first is a compound of two hexagons, the second is a compound of three squares, the third is a compound of four triangles, and the fourth is a compound of six straight-sided digons. The last two can be considered compounds of two compound hexagrams and the last as three compound tetragrams.

2{6}

3{4}

4{3}

6{2}

== Dodecagrams as isotoxal figures ==
An isotoxal polygon has two vertices and one edge type within its symmetry class. There are 5 isotoxal dodecagram star with a degree of freedom of angles, which alternates vertices at two radii, one simple, 3 compounds, and 1 unicursal star.

Isotoxal dodecagrams
Type	Simple	Compounds			Star
Density	1	2	3	4	5
Image	{(6)_{α}}	2{3_{α}}	3{2_{α}}	2{(3/2)_{α}}	{(6/5)_{α}}

== Dodecagrams as isogonal figures ==
A regular dodecagram can be seen as a quasitruncated hexagon, t{6/5}={12/5}. Other isogonal (vertex-transitive) variations with equally spaced vertices can be constructed with two edge lengths.

t{6}	t{6/5}={12/5}

== Complete graph ==
Superimposing all the dodecagons and dodecagrams on each other – including the degenerate compound of six digons (line segments), {12/6} – produces the complete graph K_{12}.

K_{12}
black: the twelve corner points (nodes) red: {12} regular dodecagon green: {12/2}=2{6} two hexagons blue: {12/3}=3{4} three squares cyan: {12/4}=4{3} four triangles magenta: {12/5} regular dodecagram yellow: {12/6}=6{2} six digons

== Regular dodecagrams in polyhedra ==
Dodecagrams can also be incorporated into uniform polyhedra. Below are the three prismatic uniform polyhedra containing regular dodecagrams (there are no other dodecagram-containing uniform polyhedra).

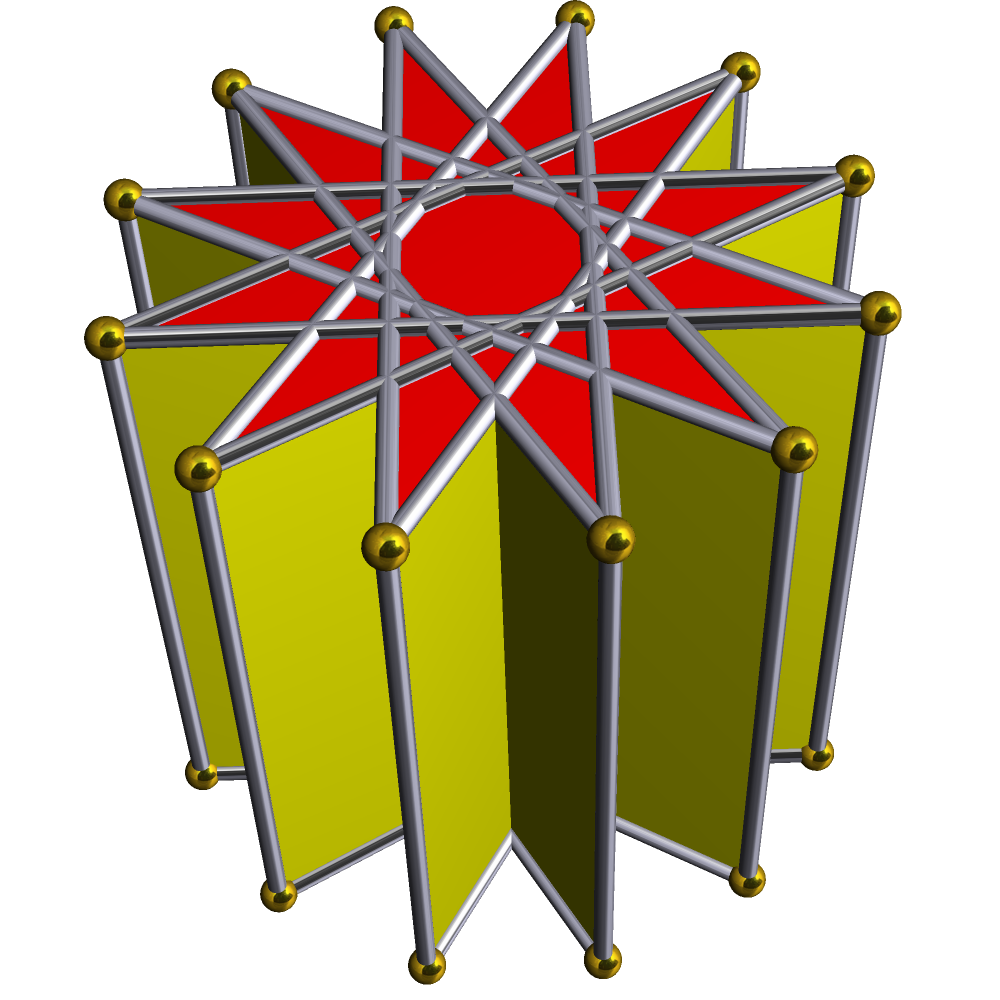
Dodecagrammic prism

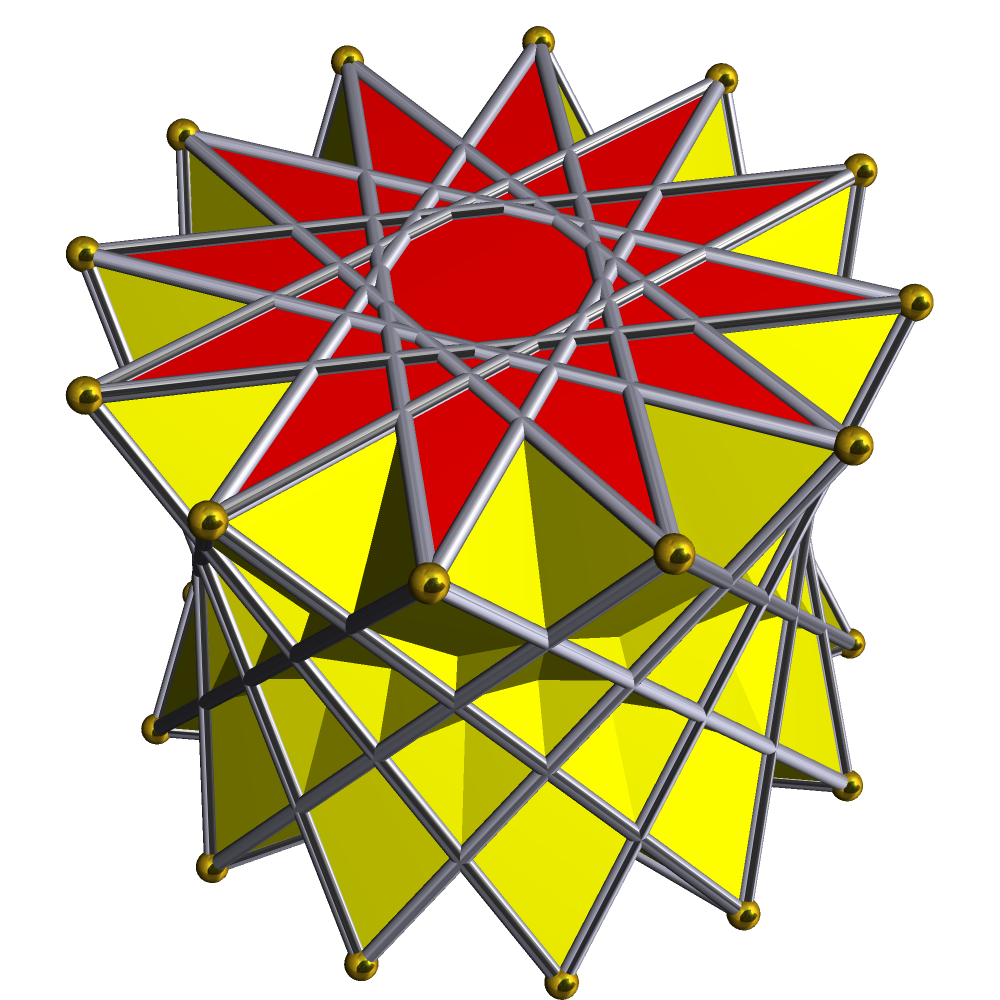
Dodecagrammic antiprism

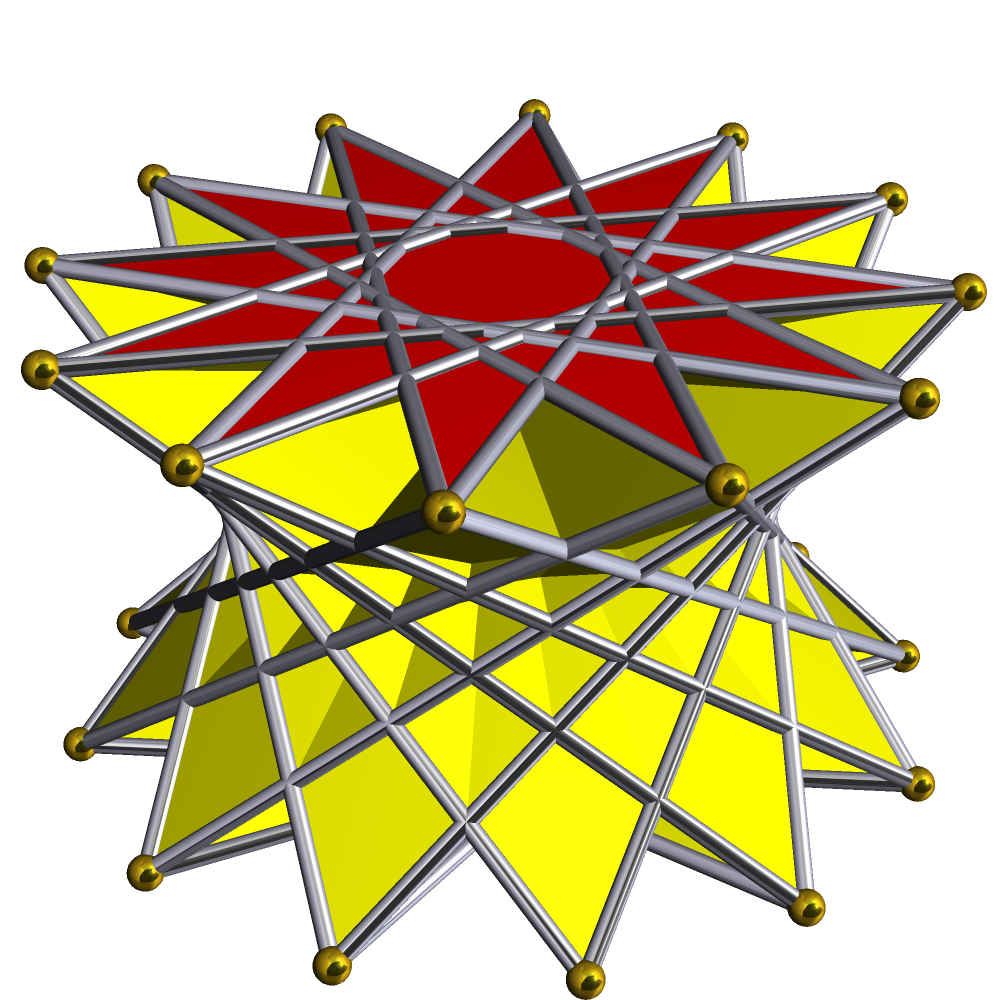
Dodecagrammic crossed-antiprism

Dodecagrams can also be incorporated into star tessellations of the Euclidean plane.

== Dodecagram symbolism ==
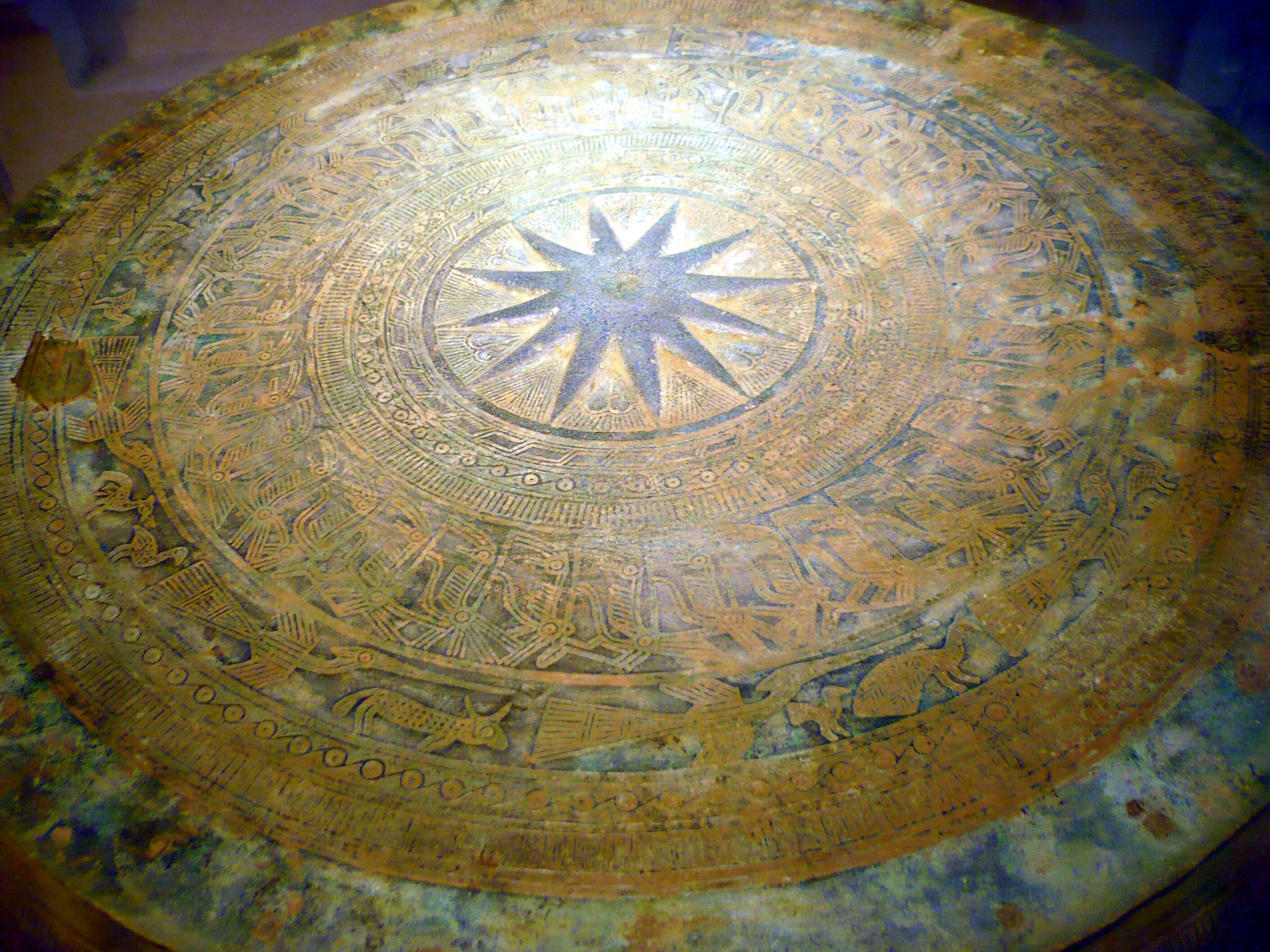
The twelve-pointed star is a prominent feature on the ancient Vietnamese Dong Son drums

Dodecagrams or twelve-pointed stars have been used as symbols for the following:

- the twelve tribes of Israel, in Judaism
- the twelve disciples, in Christianity
- the twelve olympians, in Hellenic Polytheism
- the twelve signs of the zodiac
- the International Order of Twelve Knights and Daughters of Tabor, an African-American fraternal group
- the fictional secret society Manus Sancti, in the Knights of Manus Sancti series by Bryn Donovan
- The twelve tribes of Nauru on the national flag.

== See also ==
- Stellation
- Star polygon
- List of regular polytopes and compounds
