= Hectogram =

Hectogram may refer to:

- 100 grams, a unit of mass
- a 100-sided regular star polygon
