= Polygram (geometry) =

Mathematical term in geometry

Regular polygrams {n/d}, with red lines showing constant d, and blue lines showing compound sequences k{n/d}

In geometry, a generalized polygon can be called a polygram, and named specifically by its number of sides. All polygons are polygrams, but they can also include disconnected sets of edges, called a compound polygon. For example, a regular pentagram, {5/2}, has 5 sides, and the regular hexagram, {6/2} or 2{3}, has 6 sides divided into two triangles.

A regular polygram {p/q} can either be in a set of regular star polygons (for gcd(p,q) = 1, q > 1) or in a set of regular polygon compounds (if gcd(p,q) > 1).

== Etymology ==
The polygram names combine a numeral prefix, such as penta-, with the Greek suffix -gram (in this case generating the word pentagram). The prefix is normally a Greek cardinal, but synonyms using other prefixes exist. The -gram suffix derives from γραμμή (grammē) meaning a line.

== Generalized regular polygons ==
A regular polygram, as a general regular polygon, is denoted by its Schläfli symbol {p/q}, where p and q are relatively prime (they share no factors) and q ≥ 2. For integers p and q, it can be considered as being constructed by connecting every qth point out of p points regularly spaced in a circular placement.

{5/2}	{7/2}	{7/3}	{8/3}	{9/2}	{9/4}	{10/3}...

== Regular compound polygons ==
In other cases where n and m have a common factor, a polygram is interpreted as a lower polygon, {n/k, m/k}, with k = gcd(n,m), and rotated copies are combined as a compound polygon. These figures are called regular compound polygons.

Some regular polygon compounds
Triangles...			Squares...		Pentagons...	Pentagrams...	
{6/2}=2{3}	{9/3}=3{3}	{12/4}=4{3}	{8/2}=2{4}	{12/3}=3{4}	{10/2}=2{5}	{10/4}=2{5/2}	{15/6}=3{5/2}

== See also ==
- List of regular polytopes and compounds § Stars
