= 7/3 =

7/3 may refer to:

- July 3 (month-day date notation)
- March 7 (day-month date notation)
- A type of heptagram
