= John Rigby (mathematician) =

British mathematician

John Frankland Rigby (22 April 1933 – 29 December 2014) was an English mathematician and academic of the University College of South Wales, Cardiff, when it was part of the University of Wales, and of its successor Cardiff University.

Working in the field of geometry, he became an authority on the relationship between maths and ornamental art and was national Secretary of the Mathematical Association from 1989 to 1996.

== Early life ==
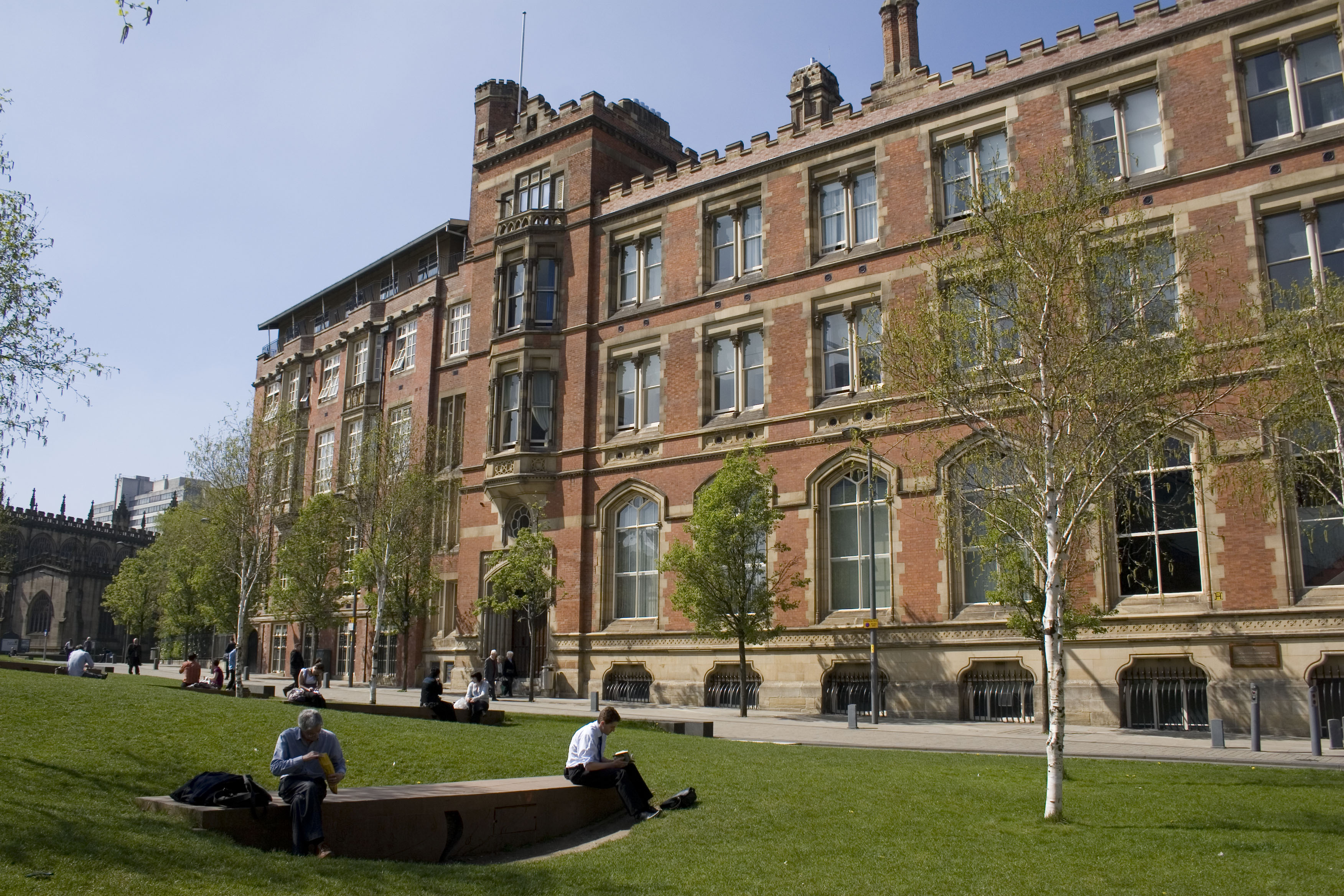
Manchester Grammar School

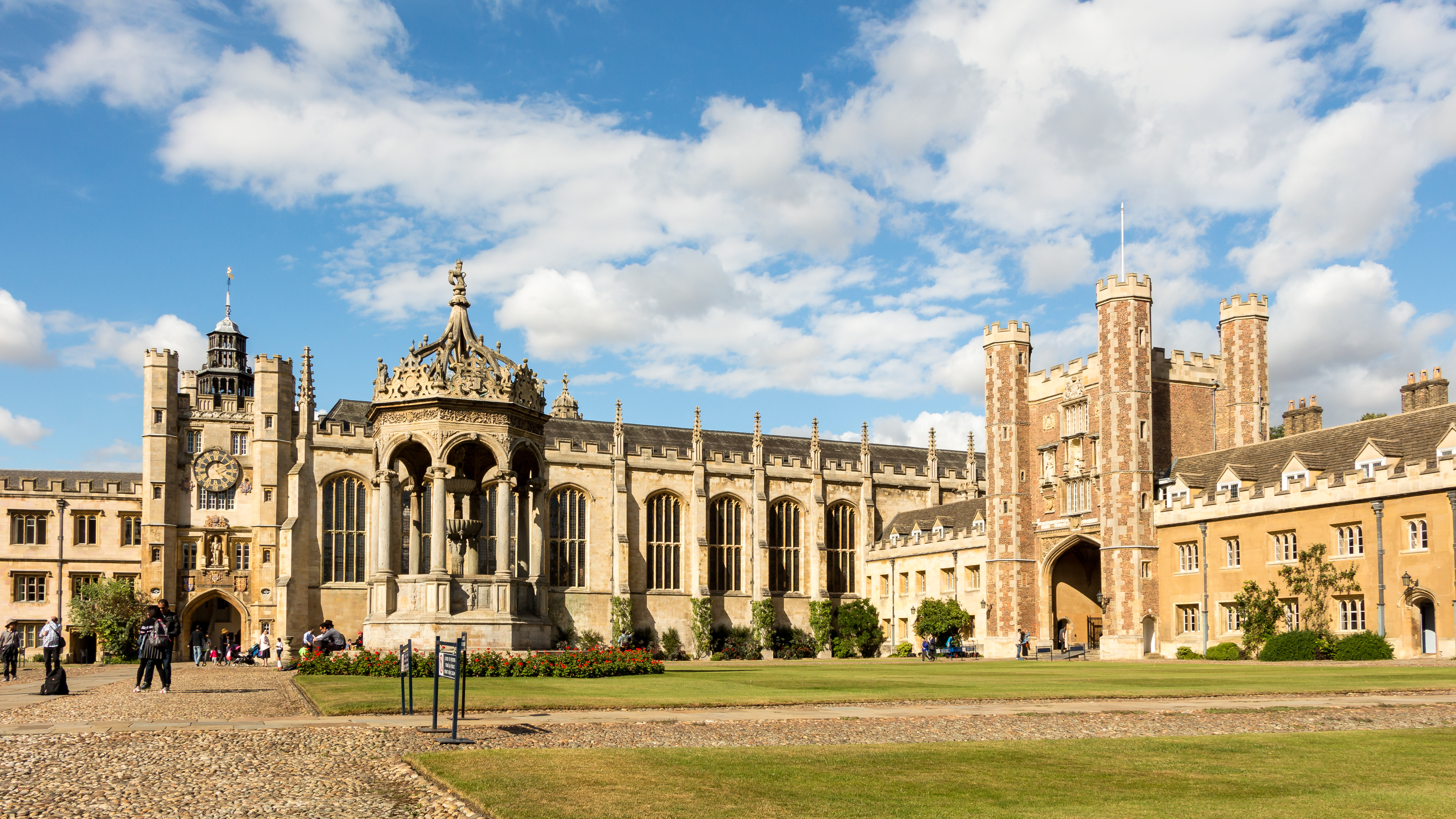
Trinity College, Cambridge

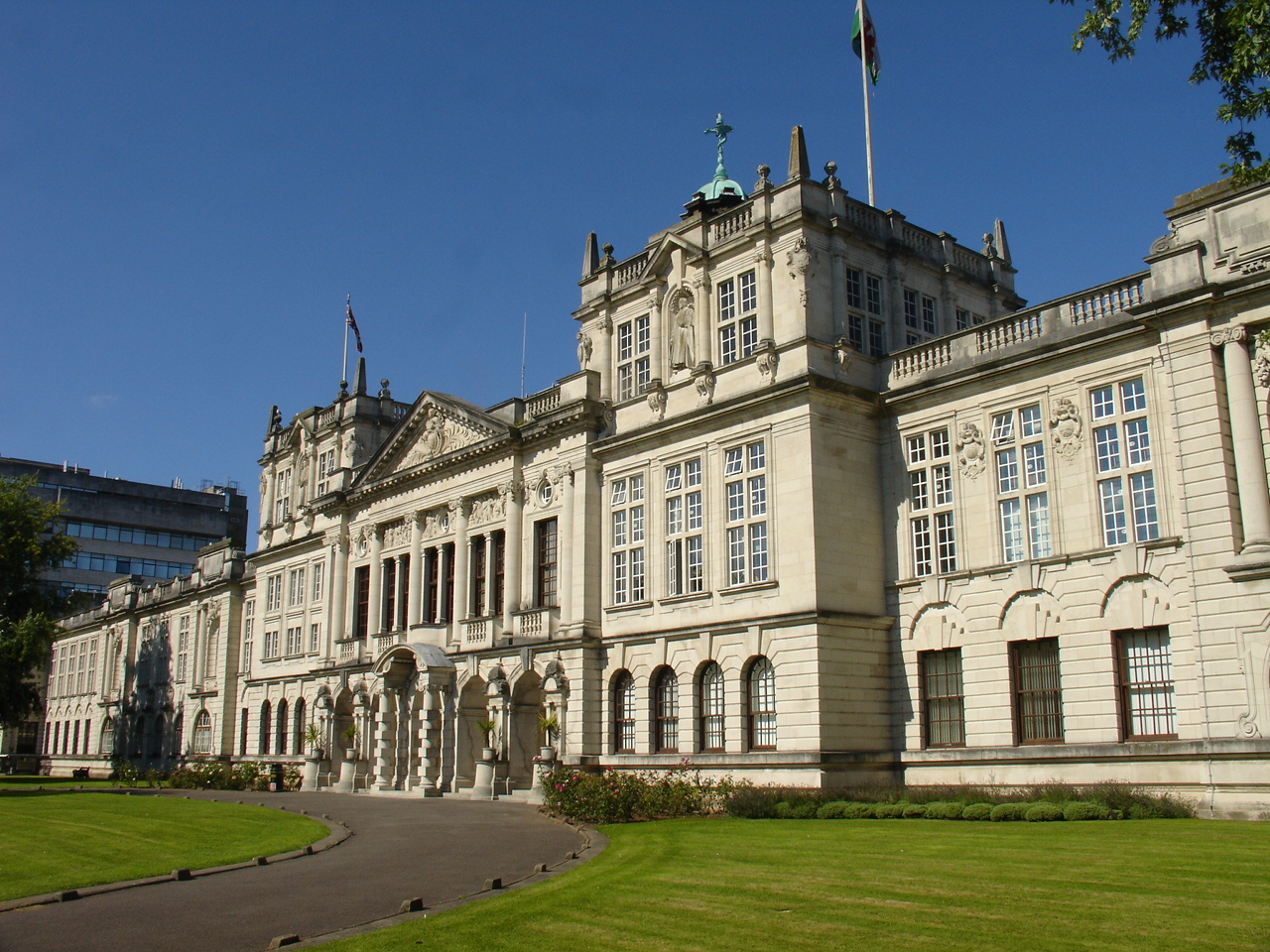
University College, Cardiff

A native of Bolton, Lancashire, now part of Greater Manchester, Rigby was the son of Fred Frankland Rigby and Bessie M. Hodkinson, who had been married at Bolton in 1931. He was educated at Manchester Grammar School and Trinity College, Cambridge, where after graduating BA in the Mathematical Tripos he remained for doctoral studies. His PhD dissertation, supervised by Philip Hall and completed in 1958, was Theory of Finite Linear Groups, and while finishing his work on this he took a job at the Government Communications Headquarters (GCHQ).

== Career ==
In 1959 Rigby was appointed to his first academic job, as a lecturer in the School of Mathematics of the University College of South Wales at Cardiff, and remained there until he retired in 1996, and beyond, as he continued to work part-time for some years. During his career, he contributed many papers on Euclidean geometry. He was also a leading authority on the interface between mathematics and ornamental art, especially Celtic art and Islamic geometric patterns, and took a close interest in traditional Japanese geometry. He visited universities in several overseas countries, especially in Turkey, Japan, and the Philippines, and also in Singapore and Canada.

Rigby lectured on complex analysis, drawing complicated curves and perfect circles on the blackboard, where he could make "magnificently accurate diagrams". He was an active member of the Mathematical Association. In the 1970s he became President of its Cardiff Branch and then was national Secretary from 1989 to 1996, at conferences giving presentations of his work. He regularly provided solutions to problems raised in the Mathematical Gazette, and an obituary described his research papers as "distinguished by their precision, concise style, and freedom from jargon".

With Branko Grünbaum, Rigby realised the Grünbaum–Rigby configuration, and Ross Honsberger named a point in a theorem by Rigby "the Rigby point". Adrian Oldknow named inner and outer Rigby points in connection with Soddy triangles, with the Rigby points lying on the Soddy line.

In retirement, Rigby began to suffer from Parkinson's disease, but was still wanted for international conferences. With his friend James Wiegold, he took charge of Cardiff University's Mathematics Club for sixth formers, drawing in students from Cardiff High School, the Cathedral School, Llandaff, Howell's School, and schools in Monmouth. Those attending meetings might offer solutions to problems which could not be faulted, but Rigby "would produce far more elegant ones, drawing gasps of admiration from the audience".

== Private life ==
Rigby sang in the Llandaff Cathedral choir and also wrote music for it. From his mathematical interest in art, he went on to create his own patterns and designs, which he turned into Christmas cards, and some were embroidered for cathedral hassocks. He belonged to a Folk Dance Society and enjoyed rambling in the Lake District and elsewhere.

Rigby died on 29 December 2014 at the University Hospital of Wales, Cardiff, aged 81. Barry Morgan, Archbishop of Wales, and the Dean of Cardiff were the ministers for his funeral service at Llandaff Cathedral on 13 January 2015. His last address was 5, Cathedral Court, Cathedral Green, Llandaff, Cardiff.

== Selected publications ==
- J. F. Rigby, "A Concentrated Dose of Old-Fashioned Geometry" in The Mathematical Gazette 57, 402 (December 1973) 296–298
- J. F. Rigby, "On the Money–Coutts Configuration of Nine Anti-Tangent Cycles" in Proceedings of the London Mathematical Society, 43 (Series 3), 1 (July 1981) 110–132, here
- J. F. Rigby, "The geometry of cycles, and generalized Laguerre inversion" in C. Davis, B. Grünbaum, F. A. Sherk, The Coxeter Festschrift (Berlin: Springer, 1981), 355–378
- J. F. Rigby, "The three circle theorem" in Mathematics Magazine 55 (1982), 312
- John Rigby, "Napoleon revisited," in Journal of Geometry 33 (1988), 126–146
- Branko Grünbaum, J. F. Rigby, "The real configuration (21_{4})" in Journal of the London Mathematical Society 41 (Series 2) (1990), 336–346, here
- John F. Rigby, "Tritangent centres, Pascal's theorem and Thebault's problem" in Journal of Geometry (November 1995) 54:134 here
- John F. Rigby, "Brief notes on some forgotten geometrical theorems" in Mathematics and Informatics Quarterly 7 (1997) 156–158
- J. F. Rigby, "Precise Colourings of Regular Triangular Tilings" in The Mathematical Intelligencer (1998) 20:4 here
