= Star polygon =

Regular non-convex polygon

Two types of star pentagons
| {5/2} | |5/2| |
A regular star pentagon, {5/2}, has five vertices (its corner tips) and five intersecting edges, while a concave decagon, |5/2|, has ten edges and two sets of five vertices. The first is used in definitions of star polyhedra and star uniform tilings, while the second is sometimes used in planar tilings.
| Small stellated dodecahedron | Tessellation |

In geometry, a star polygon is a type of non-convex polygon. Regular star polygons have been studied in depth; while star polygons in general appear not to have been formally defined, certain notable ones can arise through truncation operations on regular simple or star polygons.

Branko Grünbaum identified two primary usages of this terminology by Johannes Kepler, one corresponding to the regular star polygons with intersecting edges that do not generate new vertices, and the other one to the isotoxal concave simple polygons.

Polygrams include polygons like the pentagram, but also compound figures like the hexagram.

One definition of a star polygon, used in turtle graphics, is a polygon having q ≥ 2 turns (q is called the turning number or density), like in spirolaterals.

== Names ==
Star polygon names combine a numeral prefix, such as penta-, with the Greek suffix -gram (in this case generating the word pentagram). The -gram suffix derives from γραμμή (grammḗ), meaning a line. The name star polygon reflects the resemblance of these shapes to the diffraction spikes of real stars.

== Regular star polygon ==
| {5/2} | {7/2} | {7/3} | ... |

Regular convex and star polygons with 3 to 12 vertices, labeled with their Schläfli symbols

A regular star polygon is a self-intersecting, equilateral, and equiangular polygon.

A regular star polygon is denoted by its Schläfli symbol {p/q}, where p (the number of vertices) and q (the density) are relatively prime (they share no factors) and where q ≥ 2. The density of a polygon can also be called its turning number: the sum of the turn angles of all the vertices, divided by 360°.

The symmetry group of {p/q} is the dihedral group D_{p}, of order 2p, independent of q.

Regular star polygons were first studied systematically by Thomas Bradwardine, and later Johannes Kepler.

=== Construction via vertex connection ===
Regular star polygons can be created by connecting one vertex of a regular p-sided simple polygon to another vertex, non-adjacent to the first one, and continuing the process until the original vertex is reached again. Alternatively, for integers p and q, it can be considered as being constructed by connecting every qth point out of p points regularly spaced in a circular placement. For instance, in a regular pentagon, a five-pointed star can be obtained by drawing a line from the 1st to the 3rd vertex, from the 3rd to the 5th vertex, from the 5th to the 2nd vertex, from the 2nd to the 4th vertex, and from the 4th to the 1st vertex.

If q ≥ p/2, then the construction of {p/q} will result in the same polygon as {p/(p − q)}; connecting every third vertex of the pentagon will yield an identical result to that of connecting every second vertex. However, the vertices will be reached in the opposite direction, which makes a difference when retrograde polygons are incorporated in higher-dimensional polytopes. For example, an antiprism formed from a prograde pentagram {5/2} results in a pentagrammic antiprism; the analogous construction from a retrograde "crossed pentagram" {5/3} results in a pentagrammic crossed-antiprism. Another example is the tetrahemihexahedron, which can be seen as a "crossed triangle" {3/2} cuploid.

==== Degenerate regular star polygons ====
If p and q are not coprime, a degenerate polygon will result with coinciding vertices and edges. For example, {6/2} will appear as a triangle, but can be labeled with two sets of vertices: 1–3 and 4–6. This should be seen not as two overlapping triangles, but as a double-winding single unicursal hexagon.

=== Construction via stellation ===
Alternatively, a regular star polygon can also be obtained as a sequence of stellations of a convex regular core polygon. Constructions based on stellation also allow regular polygonal compounds to be obtained in cases where the density q and amount p of vertices are not coprime. When constructing star polygons from stellation, however, if q > p/2, the lines will instead diverge infinitely, and if q = p/2, the lines will be parallel, with both resulting in no further intersection in Euclidean space. However, it may be possible to construct some such polygons in spherical space, similarly to the monogon and digon; such polygons do not yet appear to have been studied in detail.

== Isotoxal star simple polygons ==
When the intersecting line segments are removed from a regular star n-gon, the resulting figure is no longer regular, but can be seen as an isotoxal concave simple 2n-gon, alternating vertices at two different radii. Branko Grünbaum, in Tilings and patterns, represents such a star that matches the outline of a regular polygram {n/d} as |n/d|, or more generally with {n_{𝛼}}, which denotes an isotoxal concave or convex simple 2n-gon with outer internal angle 𝛼.

- For |n/d|, the outer internal angle 𝛼 = 180(1 − 2d/n) degrees, necessarily, and the inner (new) vertices have an external angle β_{ext} = 180[1 − 2(d − 1)/n] degrees, necessarily.
- For {n_{𝛼}}, the outer internal and inner external angles, also denoted by 𝛼 and β_{ext}, do not have to match those of any regular polygram {n/d}; however, 𝛼 < 180(1 − 2/n) degrees and β_{ext} < 180°, necessarily (here, {n_{𝛼}} is concave).

Examples of isotoxal star simple polygons
| |n/d| {n_{𝛼}} | |9/4| {9_{20°}} | {3_{30°}} | {6_{30°}} | |5/2| {5_{36°}} | {4_{45°}} | |8/3| {8_{45°}} | |6/2| {6_{60°}} | {5_{72°}} |
| 𝛼 | 20° | 30° | | 36° | 45° | | 60° | 72° |
| β_{ext} | 60° | 150° | 90° | 108° | 135° | 90° | 120° | 144° |
|---|---|---|---|---|---|---|---|---|
| Isotoxal simple n-pointed star | | | | | | | | |
| Related regular polygram {n/d} | {9/4} | {12/5} | | {5/2} | {8/3} | | 2{3} Star figure | {10/3} |

=== Examples in tilings ===
These polygons are often seen in tiling patterns. The parametric angle 𝛼 (in degrees or radians) can be chosen to match internal angles of neighboring polygons in a tessellation pattern. In his 1619 work Harmonice Mundi, among periodic tilings, Johannes Kepler includes nonperiodic tilings, like that with three regular pentagons and one regular star pentagon fitting around certain vertices, 5.5.5.5/2, and related to modern Penrose tilings.

Examples of isogonal tilings with isotoxal simple stars
| Isotoxal simple n-pointed stars | "Triangular" stars (n = 3) | "Square" stars (n = 4) | "Hexagonal" stars (n = 6) | | | "Octagonal" stars (n = 8) |
|---|---|---|---|---|---|---|
| Image of tiling | | | | | | |
| Vertex config. | 3.3^{*}_{𝛼}.3.3^{**}_{𝛼} | 8.4^{*}_{π/4}.8.4^{*}_{π/4} | 6.6^{*}_{π/3}.6.6^{*}_{π/3} | 3.6^{*}_{π/3}.6^{**}_{π/3} | 3.6.6^{*}_{π/3}.6 | not edge-to-edge |

== Interiors ==
The interior of a star polygon may be treated in different ways. Three such treatments are illustrated for a pentagram. Branko Grünbaum and Geoffrey Shephard consider two of them, as regular star n-gons and as isotoxal concave simple 2n-gons.

These three treatments are:

- Where a line segment occurs, one side is treated as outside and the other as inside. This is shown in the left hand illustration and commonly occurs in computer vector graphics rendering.
- The number of times that the polygonal curve winds around a given region determines its density. The exterior is given a density of 0, and any region of density > 0 is treated as internal. This is shown in the central illustration and commonly occurs in the mathematical treatment of polyhedra. (However, for non-orientable polyhedra, density can only be considered modulo 2 and hence, in those cases, for consistency, the first treatment is sometimes used instead.)
- Wherever a line segment may be drawn between two sides, the region in which the line segment lies is treated as inside the figure. This is shown in the right hand illustration and commonly occurs when making a physical model.

When the area of the polygon is calculated, each of these approaches yields a different result.

== In art and culture ==
Star polygons feature prominently in art and culture. Such polygons may or may not be regular, but they are always highly symmetrical. Examples include:

- The {5/2} star pentagon (pentagram) is also known as a pentalpha or pentangle, and historically has been considered by many magical and religious cults to have occult significance.
- The {7/2} and {7/3} star polygons (heptagrams) also have occult significance, particularly in the Kabbalah and in Wicca.
- The {8/3} star polygon (octagram) is a frequent geometrical motif in Mughal Islamic art and architecture; the first is on the emblem of Azerbaijan.
- An eleven pointed star called the hendecagram was used on the tomb of Shah Nematollah Vali.

| An {8/3} octagram constructed in a regular octagon | Seal of Solomon with circle and dots (star figure) |

== See also ==
- Five-pointed star – Common ideogram in modern culture
- List of regular polytopes and compounds § Stars
- Magic star – Special arrangement of numbers on a star
- Moravian star – Christmas decoration
- Pentagramma mirificum – 5-sided star shaped polygon
- Regular star 4-polytope
- Rub el Hizb – Islamic symbol in the shape of an octagram
- Star (grapheme) – Typographical symbol
- Star polyhedron – Polyhedron with some pattern of nonconvexity
  - Kepler–Poinsot polyhedron – Any of 4 regular star polyhedra
  - uniform star polyhedron – Self-intersecting uniform polyhedron
- Star polygons in art and culture – Polygons as symbolic elements
- Starfish – Class of echinoderms, marine animal
