= Heptagram =

Star polygon with 7 sides

Regular heptagram (7/2)
- A regular heptagram
- Type: Regular star polygon
- Edges and vertices: 7
- Schläfli symbol: {7/2}
- Symmetry group: Dihedral (D_{7})
- Internal angle (degrees): ≈77.143°
- Properties: star, cyclic, equilateral, isogonal, isotoxal
- Dual polygon: self

Regular heptagram (7/3)
- A regular heptagram
- Type: Regular star polygon
- Edges and vertices: 7
- Schläfli symbol: {7/3}
- Symmetry group: Dihedral (D_{7})
- Internal angle (degrees): ≈25.714°
- Properties: star, cyclic, equilateral, isogonal, isotoxal
- Dual polygon: self

A heptagram, septagram, septegram or septogram is a seven-point star drawn with seven straight strokes.

The name heptagram combines a numeral prefix, hepta‑, with the Greek suffix ‑gram. The ‑gram suffix derives from γραμμῆ (grammē) meaning a line.

== Geometry ==
In general, a heptagram is any self-intersecting heptagon (7-sided polygon).

There are two regular heptagrams, labeled as {7/2} and {7/3}, with the second number representing the vertex interval step from a regular heptagon, {7/1}.

This is the smallest star polygon that can be drawn in two forms, as irreducible fractions. The two heptagrams are sometimes called the heptagram (for {7/2}) and the great heptagram (for {7/3}).

The previous one, the regular hexagram {6/2}, is a compound of two triangles. The smallest star polygon is the {5/2} pentagram.

The next one is the {8/3} octagram and its related {8/2} star figure (a compound of two squares), followed by the regular enneagram, which also has two forms: {9/2} and {9/4}, as well as one compound of three triangles {9/3}.

{7/2}	{7/3}	{7}+{7/2}+{7/3}
7-2 prism	7-3 prism	Complete graph
7-2 antiprism	7-3 antiprism	7-4 antiprism

== Uses ==
=== Flags and heraldry ===
Former Georgian coat of arms, 1918–1921, 1991–2004

The seven-pointed star of the Felibritge on the Occitan flag.

The Jordanian flag, bearing the star that symbolizes Al-Fatiha

Symbol of Hokkaido

Coat of arms of Samarkand

Commonwealth Star as the crest of coat of arms of Australia

The coat of arms and flag of Thun Switzerland
- The Bennington flag, a historical American Flag, has thirteen seven-pointed stars along with the numerals "76" in the canton.
- The Flag of Australia employs five heptagrams and one pentagram to depict the Southern Cross constellation and the Commonwealth Star.
- Some old versions of the coat of arms of Georgia including the Georgian Soviet Socialist Republic used the {7/2} heptagram as an element.

=== Law enforcement ===
Some police badges in the US have a heptagram outline.

Seal of the California Highway Patrol

=== Religious and occult symbolism ===
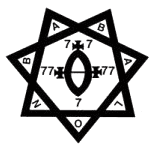
Seal of Babalon and the A∴A∴

- The heptagram became a traditional symbol for warding off evil in Catholicism.
- The symbol is also used in Kabbalist Judaism.
- The heptagram is used in the symbol for Babalon in Aleister Crowley's occult system Thelema.
- The heptagram is known among neopagans as the Elven Star or Fairy Star. It is treated as a sacred symbol in various modern pagan and witchcraft traditions. Blue Star Wicca also uses the symbol, where it is referred to as a septegram. The second heptagram is a symbol of magical power in some pagan spiritualities.
- In alchemy, a seven-sided star can refer to the seven planets which were known to early alchemists, and also, the seven alchemical substances: fire, water, air, earth, sulphur, salt and mercury.
- In astrology. For example, the planetary hours, from which comes the names of the days of the week.
- In Polynesia, the seven-pointed star is used often in imagery, basket making, tattoos, and is considered to be a symbol of Kanaloa, the first Polynesian navigator.
- The seven-sided star is an important symbol of the Cherokee people of southern Appalachia, representing the seven clans of the Cherokee and the sacred number seven.

=== In popular culture ===
Logo of Maersk

- The logo of American shoe brand DC Shoes features a {7/3} heptagram in the letter C.
- The seven-pointed star is used as the logo for the international Danish shipping company A.P. Møller – Mærsk A/S, sometimes known simply as Maersk.
- In George R. R. Martin's novel series A Song of Ice and Fire and its TV version Game of Thrones, a seven-pointed star serves as the symbol of the Faith of the Seven.
- In the manga series MeruPuri, a magical mirror/portal is in the shape of a heptagram. The symbol is also seen during spellcasting.
- English singer Damon Albarn uses a heptagram as a symbol in his solo performances and with his band Blur.
- The {7/3} heptagram is used by some members of the otherkin subculture as an identifier.
- The American progressive rock metal band Tool uses an 'open' seven pointed symbol for their fan group. It is said to be 'open' to signify an invitation into the collective unconscious.
- An alternate logo of Chicago-based Children's Press from 1945 to 1970, having the slogan "Children's Books Are Important".

=== Variants ===
Interlaced; equivalent to the 7_{1} knot

== See also ==
- Grünbaum–Rigby configuration
- Star polygon
- Stellation § Stellating polygons
- List of regular polytopes § Two-dimensional regular polytopes
- Major (United States) insignia is seven-pointed oak leaf
