= List of Greek mathematicians =

In historical times, Greek civilization has played one of the major roles in the history and development of Greek mathematics. To this day, a number of Greek mathematicians are considered for their innovations and influence on mathematics.

== Ancient Greek mathematicians ==
This list includes mathematicians working within the Greek tradition in places outside Greece such as Alexandria, Egypt, regardless of whether we know their ethnicity to be Greek.

- Anaxagoras
- Anthemius of Tralles
- Antiphon
- Apollonius of Perga
- Archimedes
- Archytas
- Aristaeus the Elder
- Aristarchus of Samos
- Aristotle
- Asclepius of Tralles
- Attalus of Rhodes
- Autolycus of Pitane
- Bion of Abdera
- Bryson of Heraclea
- Callippus
- Carpus of Antioch
- Chrysippus
- Cleomedes
- Conon of Samos
- Ctesibius
- Democritus
- Dicaearchus
- Dinostratus
- Diocles
- Dionysodorus
- Diophantus
- Domninus of Larissa
- Eratosthenes
- Euclid
- Eudemus
- Eudoxus of Cnidus
- Eutocius of Ascalon
- Geminus
- Heliodorus of Larissa
- Hero of Alexandria
- Hipparchus
- Hippasus
- Hippias
- Hippocrates of Chios
- Hypatia
- Hypsicles
- Isidore of Miletus
- Leodamas of Thasos
- Leon
- Marinus of Neapolis
- Menaechmus
- Menelaus of Alexandria
- Meton of Athens
- Metrodorus
- Nicomachus
- Nicomedes
- Nicoteles of Cyrene
- Oenopides
- Pandrosion
- Pappus of Alexandria
- Perseus (geometer)
- Philolaus
- Philon
- Philonides of Laodicea
- Polyaenus of Lampsacus
- Porphyry
- Posidonius
- Proclus
- Ptolemy
- Pythagoras
- Serenus of Antinouplis
- Simplicius of Cilicia
- Sosigenes of Alexandria
- Sporus of Nicaea
- Thales
- Theaetetus
- Theano
- Theodorus of Cyrene
- Theodosius of Bithynia
- Theon of Alexandria
- Theon of Smyrna
- Theudius
- Thrasyllus of Mendes
- Thymaridas
- Xenocrates
- Zeno of Elea
- Zeno of Sidon
- Zenodorus

== Medieval Byzantine mathematicians ==
- Stephanus of Alexandria
- Maximus Planudes
- Isaac Argyros
- John Philoponus
- Anthemius of Tralles

== Modern Greek mathematicians ==
- Leonidas Alaoglu (1914–1981) - Known for Banach- Alaoglu theorem.
- Charalambos D. Aliprantis (1946–2009) - Founder and Editor-in-Chief of the journals Economic Theory as well as Annals of Finance.
- Roger Apéry (1916–1994) - Professor of mathematics and mechanics at the University of Caen. Proved the irrationality of ζ(3), known as Apéry's constant.
- Tom M. Apostol (1923–2016) - Professor of mathematics in California Institute of Technology, he has authored a number of books about mathematics.
- Dimitri Bertsekas (1942–2026) - Member of the National Academy of Engineering professor with the Department of Electrical Engineering and Computer Science. Author of fifteen books and research monographs, and coauthor of an introductory probability textbook
- Giovanni Carandino (1784–1834)
- Constantin Carathéodory (1873–1950) - Mathematician who pioneered the Axiomatic Formulation of Thermodynamics.
- Demetrios Christodoulou (born 1951) - Mathematician-physicist who has contributed in the field of general relativity.
- Constantine Dafermos (born 1941) - Usually notable for hyperbolic conservation laws and control theory.
- Mihalis Dafermos (born 1976) - Professor of Mathematics at Princeton University and Lowndean Chair of Astronomy and Geometry at the University of Cambridge
- Apostolos Doxiadis (born 1953) - Australian born Mathematician.
- Athanassios S. Fokas (born 1952) - Contributor in the field of integrable nonlinear partial differential equations.
- Michael Katehakis (born 1952) - Professor at Rutgers University.
- Alexander S. Kechris (born 1946) - Made notable contribution for the theory of Borel equivalence relations.
- Nicholas Metropolis (1915–1999) - American born Greek physicist.
- Yiannis N. Moschovakis (1938) - Writer, also worked as theorist in University of California, Los Angeles.
- Christos Papakyriakopoulos (1914–1976) - Often called Papa, he specialized in geometric topology.
- Athanasios Papoulis (1921–2002) - Contributed a number of theories, such as Papoulis–Gerchberg algorithm, A eloquent proof, among others.
- Themistocles M. Rassias (born 1951) - Professor at the National Technical University of Athens.
- Raphaël Salem (1898–1963) - Greek mathematician after whom are named the Salem numbers and whose widow founded the Salem Prize.
- Cyparissos Stephanos (1857–1917) - Notable contributor of desmic systems.
- Katia Sycara - Professor in the Carnegie Mellon School of Computer Science's Robotics Institute and the director of the Laboratory for Agents technology and Semantic web technologies.
- Nicholas Varopoulos (born 1940) - Notable for his analysis on Lie groups.
- Stathis Zachos (born 1947) - Published a number of writings on computer science.
- Mihail Zervos - Working in Department of Mathematics, London School of Economics.
