= Ancient Greek mathematics =

In the Greek world from 5th BC to 6th AD

An illustration of Euclid's proof of the Pythagorean theorem

Ancient Greek mathematics refers to the history of mathematical ideas and texts in Ancient Greece during classical and late antiquity, mostly from the 5th century BC to the 6th century AD. Greek mathematicians lived in cities spread around the shores of the ancient Mediterranean, from Anatolia to Italy and North Africa, but were united by Greek culture and the Greek language. The development of mathematics as a theoretical discipline and the systematization of the use of deductive reasoning and proofs is an important difference between Greek mathematics and those of preceding civilizations.

The early history of Greek mathematics is obscure, and traditional narratives of mathematical theorems found before the fifth century BC are regarded as later inventions. It is now generally accepted that treatises of deductive mathematics written in Greek began circulating around the mid-fifth century BC, but the earliest complete work on the subject is Euclid's Elements, written during the Hellenistic period. The works of renowned mathematicians Archimedes and Apollonius, as well as of the astronomer Hipparchus, also belong to this period. In the Imperial Roman era, Ptolemy used trigonometry to determine the positions of stars in the sky, while Nicomachus and other ancient philosophers revived ancient number theory and harmonics. During late antiquity, Pappus of Alexandria wrote his Collection, summarizing the work of his predecessors, while Diophantus' Arithmetica dealt with the solution of arithmetic problems by way of pre-modern algebra. Later authors such as Theon of Alexandria, his daughter Hypatia, and Eutocius of Ascalon wrote commentaries on the authors making up the ancient Greek mathematical corpus.

The works of ancient Greek mathematicians were copied in the Byzantine period and translated into Arabic and Latin, where they exerted influence on mathematics in the Islamic world and in Medieval Europe. During the Renaissance, the texts of Euclid, Archimedes, Apollonius, and Pappus in particular went on to influence the development of early modern mathematics. Some problems in Ancient Greek mathematics were solved only in the modern era by mathematicians such as Carl Gauss, and attempts to prove or disprove Euclid's parallel line postulate spurred the development of non-Euclidean geometry. Ancient Greek mathematics was not limited to theoretical works but was also used in other activities, such as business transactions and land mensuration, as evidenced by extant texts where computational procedures and practical considerations took more of a central role.

== Etymology ==
The Greek word mathēmatikē (μαθηματική) derives from máthēma (μάθημα 'lesson'), and ultimately from the verb manthánō (μανθάνω 'I learn'). Strictly speaking, a máthēma could be any branch of learning, or anything learnt; however, since antiquity certain mathēmatá were granted special status: arithmetic, geometry, astronomy, and harmonics. (Note: Arithmetic, which dealt with numbers, included not only basic operations of addition, subtraction, multiplication, and division, but also what we would now consider algebra and number theory. Geometry (lit. 'land mensuration') included not only plane and solid geometry and the theory of conic sections, but also optics. Astronomy dealt with phenomena related to the stars and the five planets, and fostered the development of astronomical models and trigonometry. Harmonics dealt primarily with the theory of music scales using means and ratios.) These four mathēmatá, which appear listed together around the time of Archytas and Plato, would later become the medieval quadrivium. Geminus of Rhodes (1st century BC) later divided the mathematics of the quadrivium in two parts: one dealing with intelligibles (arithmetic and geometry), and the other with perceptibles (astronomy and harmonics). To the latter, he added mechanics, optics, geodesy, and logistics, which are now part of physics or applied mathematics.

== Origins ==
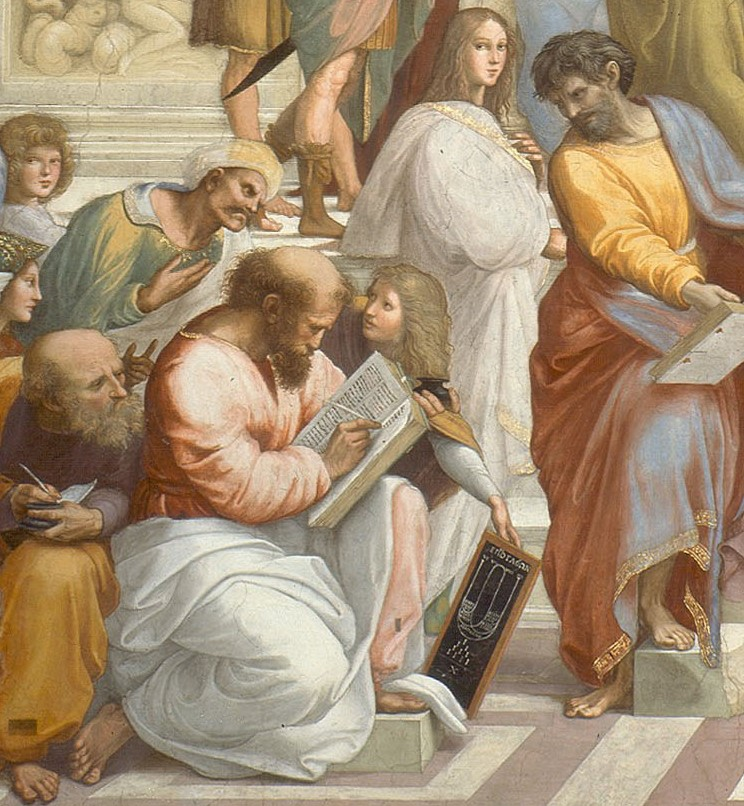
Pythagoras with a tablet of ratios, detail from The School of Athens by Raphael (1509). Modern historians question whether Pythagoras made any mathematical discoveries such as the Pythagorean theorem.

The origins of Greek mathematics are not well understood. The earliest advanced civilizations in Greece were the Minoan and later Mycenaean civilizations, both of which flourished in the second half of the Bronze Age. While these civilizations possessed writing, and many Linear B tablets and similar objects have been deciphered, no mathematical writings have yet been discovered. The mathematics from the preceding Babylonian and Egyptian civilizations were primarily focused on land mensuration and accounting. Although some problems were contrived to be challenging beyond any obvious practical application, there are no signs of explicit theoretical concerns as found in Ancient Greek mathematics. It is generally thought that Babylonian and Egyptian mathematics had an influence on the younger Greek culture, possibly through an oral tradition of mathematical problems over the course of centuries, though no direct evidence of transmission is available.

When Greek writing re-emerged in the 7th century BC, following the Late Bronze Age collapse, it was based on an entirely new system derived from the Phoenician alphabet, with Egyptian papyrus being the preferred medium. Because the earliest known mathematical treatises in Greek, starting with Hippocrates of Chios in the 5th century BC, have been lost, the early history of Greek mathematics must be reconstructed from information passed down through later authors, beginning in the mid-4th century BC. Much of the knowledge about early Greek mathematics is thanks to references by Plato, Aristotle, and from quotations of Eudemus of Rhodes' histories of mathematics by later authors. These references provide near-contemporary accounts for many mathematicians active in the 4th century BC. Euclid's Elements is also believed to contain many theorems that are attributed to mathematicians in the preceding centuries.

=== Archaic period ===
Ancient Greek tradition attributes the origin of Greek mathematics to either Thales of Miletus (7th century BC), one of the legendary Seven Sages of Greece, or to Pythagoras of Samos (6th century BC), both of whom supposedly visited Egypt and Babylon and learned mathematics there. However, modern scholarship tends to be skeptical of such claims as neither Thales or Pythagoras left any writings that were available in the Classical period. Additionally, widespread literacy and the scribal culture that would have supported the transmission of mathematical treatises did not emerge fully until the 5th century; the oral literature of their time was primarily focused on public speeches and recitations of poetry. The standard view among historians is that the discoveries Thales and Pythagoras are credited with, such as Thales' Theorem, the Pythagorean theorem, and the Platonic solids, are the product of attributions by much later authors.

=== Classical Greece ===
One of the earliest documented results in Ancient Greek mathematics is the Lune of Hippocrates, from the late 5th century BC. The shaded portion in the upper left is the same area as the shaded part of the triangle

The earliest traces of Greek mathematical treatises appear in the second half of the fifth century BC. According to Eudemus, Hippocrates of Chios was the first to write a book of Elements in the tradition later continued by Euclid. Fragments from another treatise written by Hippocrates on lunes also survives, possibly as an attempt to square the circle. Eudemus' states that Hippocrates studied with an astronomer named Oenopides of Chios. Other mathematicians associated with Chios include Andron and Zenodotus, who may be associated with a "school of Oenopides" mentioned by Proclus.

Although many stories of the early Pythagoreans are likely apocryphal, including stories about people being drowned or exiled for sharing mathematical discoveries, some fifth-century Pythagoreans may have contributed to mathematics. Beginning with Philolaus of Croton, a contemporary of Socrates, studies in arithmetic, geometry, astronomy, and harmonics became increasingly associated with Pythagoreanism. Fragments of Philolaus' work are preserved in quotations from later authors. Aristotle is one of the earliest authors to associate Pythagoreanism with mathematics, though he never attributed anything specifically to Pythagoras.

Other extant evidence shows fifth-century philosophers' acquaintance with mathematics: Antiphon claimed to be able to construct a rectilinear figure with the same area as a given circle, while Hippias is credited with a method for squaring a circle with a neusis construction. Protagoras and Democritus debated the possibility for a line to intersect a circle at a single point. According to Archimedes, Democritus also asserted, apparently without proof, that the area of a cone was 1/3 the area of a cylinder with the same base, a result which was later proved by Eudoxus of Cnidus.

==== Mathematics in the time of Plato ====
While Plato was not a mathematician, numerous early mathematicians were associated with Plato or with his Academy. Familiarity with mathematicians' work is also reflected in several Platonic dialogues where mathematics are mentioned, including the Meno, the Theaetetus, the Republic, and the Timaeus.

Archytas, a Pythagorean philosopher from Tarentum, was a friend of Plato who made several contributions to mathematics, including solving the problem of doubling the cube, now known to be impossible with only a compass and a straightedge, using an alternative method. He also systematized the study of means, and possibly worked on optics and mechanics. Archytas has been credited with early material found in Books VII–IX of the Elements, which deal with elementary number theory.

Theaetetus is one of the main characters in the Platonic dialogue named after him, where he works on a problem given to him by Theodorus of Cyrene to demonstrate that the square roots of several numbers from 3 to 17 are irrational, leading to the construction now known as the Spiral of Theodorus. Theaetetus is traditionally credited with much of the work contained in Book X of the Elements, concerned with incommensurable magnitudes, and Book XIII, which outlines the construction of the regular polyhedra. Although some of the regular polyhedra were certainly known previously, he is credited with their systematic study and the proof that only five of them exist.

Another mathematician who might have visited Plato's Academy is Eudoxus of Cnidus, associated with the theory of proportion found in Book V of the Elements. Archimedes credits Eudoxus with a proof that the volume of a cone is one-third the volume of a cylinder with the same base, which appears in two propositions in Book XII of the Elements. He also developed an astronomical calendar, now lost, that remains partially preserved in Aratus' poem Phaenomena. Eudoxus seems to have founded a school of mathematics in Cyzicus, where one of his students, Menaechmus, went on to develop a theory of conic sections.

== Hellenistic and early Roman period ==
Ancient Greek mathematics reached its acme during the Hellenistic and early Roman periods. Alexander the Great's conquest of the Eastern Mediterranean, Egypt, Mesopotamia, the Iranian plateau, Central Asia, and parts of India led to the spread of the Greek culture and language across these regions. Koine Greek became the lingua franca of scholarship throughout the Hellenistic world, and the mathematics of the Classical period merged with Egyptian and Babylonian mathematics to give rise to Hellenistic mathematics. Several centers of learning also appeared around this time, of which the most important one was the Mouseion in Alexandria, in Ptolemaic Egypt.

Although few in number, Hellenistic mathematicians actively communicated with each other in correspondence; publication consisted of passing and copying someone's work among colleagues. Much of the work represented by authors such as Euclid, Archimedes, Apollonius, and Ptolemy was of a very advanced level and rarely mastered outside a small circle.

Euclid collected many previous mathematical results and theorems in the Elements, a reference work that would become a canon of geometry and elementary number theory for many centuries. Archimedes used the method of exhaustion to approximate Pi (Measurement of a Circle), measured the surface area and volume of a sphere (On the Sphere and Cylinder), devised a mechanical method for developing solutions to mathematical problems using the law of the lever, (Method of Mechanical Theorems), and developed a way to represent very large numbers (The Sand-Reckoner). Apollonius of Perga, in his extant work Conics, refined and developed the theory of conic sections that was first outlined by Menaechmus, Euclid, and Conon of Samos. Trigonometry was developed around the time of the astronomer Hipparchus, and both trigonometry and astronomy were further developed by Ptolemy in his Almagest.

=== Arithmetic ===
Euclid devoted part of his Elements (Books VII–IX) to topics that belong to elementary number theory, including prime numbers and divisibility. He gave an algorithm, the Euclidean algorithm, for computing the greatest common divisor of two numbers (Prop. VII.2) and a proof implying the infinitude of primes (Prop. IX.20). There is also older material likely based on Pythagorean teachings (Prop. IX.21–34), such as "odd times even is even" and "if an odd number measures [= divides] an even number, then it also measures [= divides] half of it". Ancient Greek mathematicians conventionally separated numbers (mostly positive integers but occasionally rationals) from magnitudes or lengths, with only the former being the subject of arithmetic.

The Pythagorean tradition spoke of so-called polygonal or figurate numbers. The study of the sums of triangular and pentagonal numbers would prove fruitful in the early modern period. Building on the works of the earlier Pythagoreans, Nicomachus of Gerasa wrote an Introduction to Arithmetic which would go on to receive later commentary in late antiquity and the Middle Ages. Theon of Smyrna's Mathematics Useful For Understanding Plato, written around the same time, discusses the idea of congruences.

An epigram published by Lessing in 1773 appears to be a letter sent by Archimedes to Eratosthenes. The epigram proposed what has become known as Archimedes's cattle problem; its solution (absent from the manuscript) requires solving an indeterminate quadratic equation (which reduces to what would later be misnamed Pell's equation). As far as it is known, such equations were first successfully treated by Indian mathematicians. It is not known whether Archimedes himself had a method of solution.

=== Geometry ===
The construction of the Platonic solids, from Book XIII of the Elements, is often credited to Theaetetus, who was active around the time of Plato

During the Hellenistic age, three construction problems in geometry became famous: doubling the cube, trisecting an angle, and squaring the circle, all of which are now known to be impossible with a straight edge and compass. Many attempts were made using neusis constructions including the Cissoid of Diocles, Quadratrix, and the Conchoid of Nicomedes. Regular polygons and polyhedra had already been known before Euclid's Elements, but Archimedes extended their study to include semiregular polyhedra, also known as Archimedean solids. A work transmitted as Book XIV of Euclid's Elements, likely written a few centuries later by Hypsicles, lists other works on the topic, such Aristaeus the Elder's Comparison of Five Figures and Apollonius of Perga's Comparison of the Dodecahedron and the Icosahedron. Another book, transmitted as Book XV of Euclid's Elements, which was compiled in the 6th century AD, provides further developments.

Most of the works that became part of a standard mathematical curriculum in late antiquity were composed during the Hellenistic period: Data and Porisms by Euclid, several works by Apollonius of Perga including Cutting off a ratio, Cutting off an area, Determinate section, Tangencies, and Neusis, and several works dealing with loci, including Plane Loci and Conics by Apollonius, Solid Loci by Aristaeus the Elder, Loci on a Surface by Euclid, and On Means by Eratosthenes of Cyrene. All of these works other than Data, Conics Books I–VII, and Cutting off a ratio are lost but are known from Book 7 of Pappus' Collection.

=== Applied mathematics ===
Astronomy was considered one of the mathēmatá, and accordingly many Hellenistic mathematicians devoted time to astronomy. The development of trigonometry as a synthesis of Babylonian and Greek methods is commonly attributed to Hipparchus, whose only extant work is his Commentary on the Phaenomena of Eudoxus and Aratus. In the 2nd century AD, Ptolemy wrote the Mathematical Syntaxis, now known as the Almagest, explaining the motions of the stars and planets according to a geocentric model, and calculated chord tables to a higher degree of precision, along with an instruction manual, in the Handy Tables.

The ancient Greeks regarded harmonics as the science of the arrangements of pitched sounds behind musical melody, including the principles which govern them. It was the most important branch of ancient Greek musical theory, studied by philosophers, mathematicians and astronomers as well as by musical specialists. Works in mathematical harmonics in the Hellenistic period include the Sectio Canonis, attributed to Euclid, and Ptolemy's Harmonics.

The study of optics was often viewed as a part of applied geometry. An extant work on catoptrics is dubiously attributed to Euclid. Archimedes presumably wrote a now lost work on catoptrics, while Diocles' On Burning Mirrors is extant in Arabic. Mechanics was considered a subordinate science to geometry, similar to optics, and the first mathematical treatment of mechanical topics appears in the Aristotelian Mechanical Problems. Other works in this tradition include Archimedes' On the Equilibrium of Planes, Philo's Compendium of Mechanics, and Hero's Mechanica (extant in Arabic). The construction of analogue computers like the Antikythera mechanism, the measurement of the circumference of the Earth by Eratosthenes, and the design of sundials and water clocks by Ctesibius and others are additional examples of applied mathematics in this period.

== Late antiquity ==
Although the mathematicians in the later Roman era generally had few notable original works, they are distinguished for their commentaries and expositions on the works of their predecessors. These commentaries have preserved valuable extracts from works no longer extant, or historical allusions which, in the absence of original documents, are precious because of their rarity.

=== Diophantus' Arithmetica ===
Diophantus, arguably active no later than the 3rd century AD, wrote a book on polygonal numbers in addition to a work in pre-modern algebra, the Arithmetica. It is a collection of 290 algebraic problems giving numerical solutions of determinate equations (those with a unique solution) and indeterminate equations (which admit of more than one solution). Arithmetica was originally written in thirteen books, but only six of them survive in Greek, while another four books survive in Arabic, which were discovered in 1968. The books in Arabic correspond to books 4 to 7 of the original treatise, while the Greek books correspond to books 1 to 3 and 8 to 10. Diophantus made use of pre-modern algebraic symbolism in the form of an abridged notation for frequently occurring operations, and an abbreviation for the unknown number or arithmos (ζ) as well as for the powers of the unknown.

=== Pappus' Collection ===
Pappus of Alexandria compiled a survey of earlier mathematical methods and results in the Collection in eight books, of which part of Book II and Books III–VII are extant in Greek and Book VIII is extant in Arabic. The collection covers a wide span of Ancient Greek mathematics, with a particular focus on the Hellenistic period. Book III is framed as a letter to Pandrosion, a woman mathematician, and discusses solutions to three construction problems: doubling the cube, angle trisection, and squaring the circle. Book IV discusses classical geometry, which Pappus divides into plane geometry, line geometry, and solid geometry, and includes a discussion of Archimedes' construction of the arbelos. Book V discusses isoperimetric figures, summarizing otherwise lost works by Zenodotus and Archimedes on isoperimetric plane and solid figures, respectively. Book VI deals with astronomy, commenting on some of the works making up the Little Astronomy. Book VII deals with ancient analysis, providing epitomes and lemmas from otherwise lost works of Apollonius and others. Book VIII is an introduction to ancient mechanics. The Greek version breaks off in the middle of a sentence discussing Hero of Alexandria, but a complete edition of Book VIII survives in Arabic.

=== Mathematical commentaries ===
The commentary tradition began in the late Hellenistic period and continued into late antiquity. The first known commentary on the Elements was written by Hero of Alexandria, who likely set the format for future commentaries. Serenus of Antinoöpolis wrote a lost commentary on the Conics of Apollonius, along with two works that survive, Section of a Cylinder and Section of a Cone, expanding on specific subjects in the Conics. Pappus wrote a commentary on Book X of the Elements, while Heliodorus of Larissa wrote a summary of Euclid's Optics.

Many of the late antique commentators were associated with Neoplatonist philosophy. These include Porphyry of Tyre, a student of Plotinus, who wrote a commentary on Ptolemy's Harmonics, and Iamblichus, a student of Porphyry, who wrote a commentary on Nicomachus' Introduction to Arithmetic. Proclus, active in 5th-century Athens, wrote a commentary on Euclid's Elements, of which the first book survives, while his contemporary Domninus of Larissa wrote a Manual of Introductory Arithmetic, combining ideas from Nicomachus' and Euclid's number theory. Marinus of Neapolis, Proclus' successor, wrote an Introduction to Euclid's Data.

In Alexandria, Theon of Alexandria wrote a commentary on Ptolemy's Almagest and two commentaries on the Handy Tables, while his daughter Hypatia possibly wrote a commentary on Diophantus' Arithmetica and a commentary on the Conics of Apollonius, neither of which have survived. Ammonius Hermiae, John Philoponus, and Simplicius of Cilicia wrote commentaries on the works of Aristotle that preserve information on earlier mathematicians and philosophers. Eutocius of Ascalon (c. 480–540), a student of Ammonius, wrote a commentary on Apollonius' Conics and commentaries on treatises of Archimedes that are extant.

The commentary tradition continued elsewhere in the Byzantine era. Anthemius of Tralles wrote a work On Surprising Mechanisms which treats "burning mirrors" and skeptically attempts to explain the function of Archimedes' heat ray. Isidore of Miletus, who took over construction of the Hagia Sophia after Anthemius' death, supervised the revision of Eutocius' commentaries of Archimedes. From someone in Isidore's circle we also have a work on polyhedra that is transmitted as Book XV of Euclid's Elements. In Rome, Boethius translated works on the quadrivium into Latin, deriving much of his commentary from Nicomachus' Introduction to Arithmetic and Introduction to Harmonics.

== Reception and legacy ==
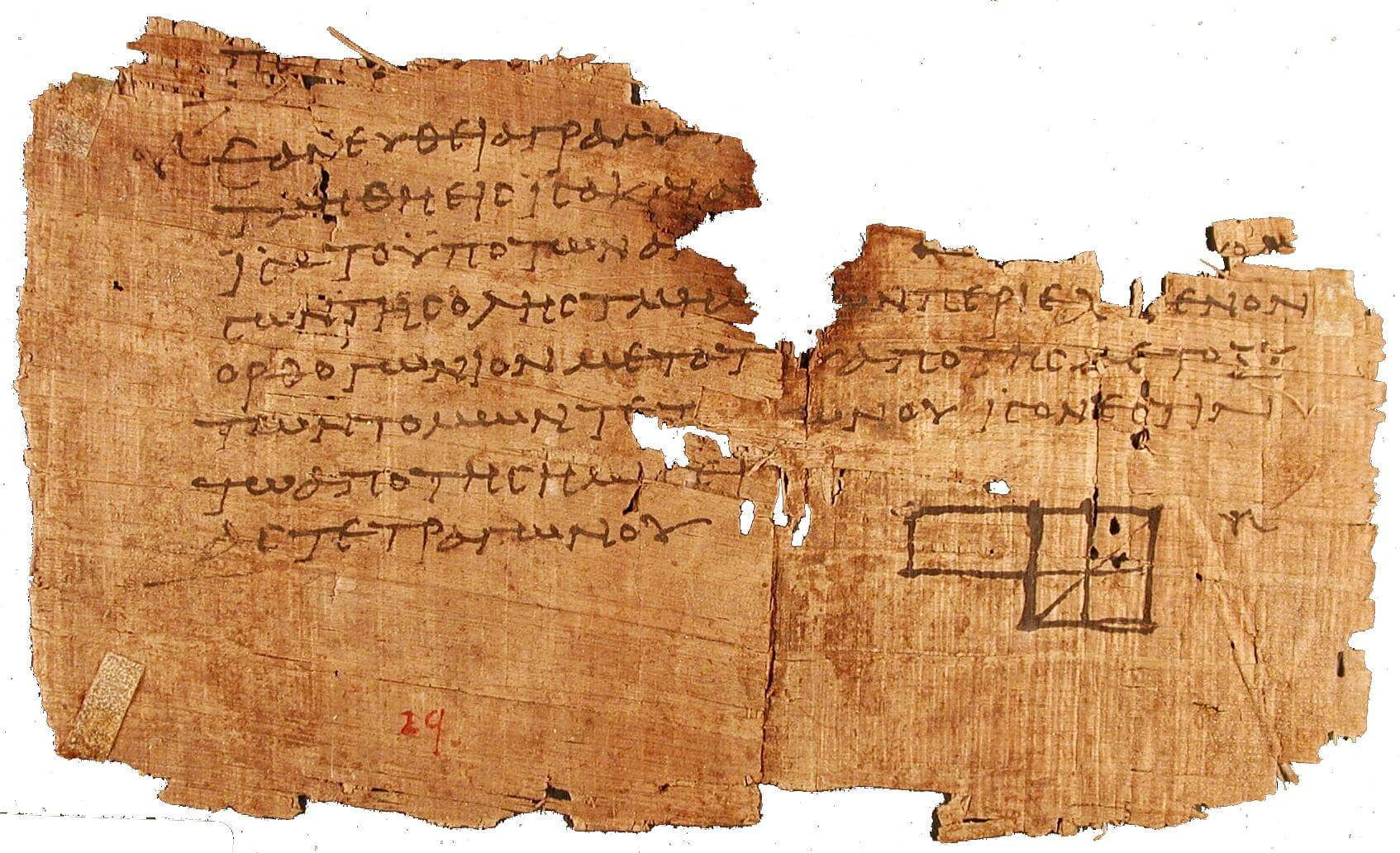
A papyrus fragment (P. Oxy. 29) from Euclid's Elements Book II, dated to approximately 100 AD.

The majority of mathematical treatises written in Ancient Greek have been lost, with about a third of the works known from references being extant. Authors whose works survive in Greek manuscripts include: Autolycus of Pitane, Euclid, Aristarchus of Samos, Archimedes, Philo of Byzantium, Biton of Pergamon, Apollonius of Perga, Hipparchus, Hypsicles, Theodosius of Bithynia, Geminus, Athenaeus Mechanicus, Hero of Alexandria, Apollodorus of Damascus, Theon of Smyrna, Nicomachus, Ptolemy, Cleomedes, Cleonides, Gaudentius, Diophantus, Serenus of Antinoöpolis, Porphyry, Aristides Quintilian, Iamblichus, Alypius, Pappus of Alexandria, Theon of Alexandria, Proclus, Domninus of Larissa, Marinus of Neapolis, Heliodorus of Larissa, Eutocius and Anthemius of Tralles.

The earliest surviving fragments recording ancient Greek mathematics are P. Hib. i 27, which contains a parapegma of Eudoxus' astronomical calendar, and several ostraca from the 3rd century BC that deal with propositions XIII.10 and XIII.16 of Euclid's Elements. A papyrus recovered from Herculaneum contains an essay by the Epicurean philosopher Demetrius Lacon on Euclid's Elements.

Most of the oldest extant manuscripts in Greek mathematics date from the 9th century onward, as copies of works written during and before the Hellenistic period. The two major sources of manuscripts are Byzantine-era codices, copied some 500 to 1500 years after their originals, and Arabic translations of Greek works. Accordingly, what has survived reflects the preferences of readers in late antiquity along with the interests of mathematicians in the Byzantine empire and the medieval Islamic world who preserved and copied them.

Despite the lack of original manuscripts, the dates for some Greek mathematicians are more certain than the dates of surviving Babylonian or Egyptian sources because a number of overlapping chronologies exist, though many dates remain uncertain.

=== Greek mathematics in the Byzantine era ===
Although Greek mathematics declined after the closure of Neoplatonist schools in the 6th century, many works were preserved in medieval manuscript transmission and translated first into Syriac and Arabic, and later into Latin. The transliteration from Greek uncial (majuscule) to minuscule script was a major undertaking that began in the 9th and 10th centuries of the Byzantine era; although a few uncial manuscripts do survive, many works that were not copied at this time were lost. Many surviving works are derived from only a single manuscript dating back to this period, including Pappus' Collection and Books I–IV of Apollonius' Conics.

Two important figures in the transmission of ancient Greek mathematics in the Byzantine period, associated with Photios I, are Leo the Mathematician and Arethas of Caesarea. Leo collected and encouraged the transliterations of many mathematical works, an effort than continued well into the 10th and 11th centuries. Three different recensions of the works of Archimedes date from this period, two of which are now lost after being copied, while the third is the Archimedes Palimpsest, rediscovered in 1906. There are scholia written by Arethas in the margins of Euclid's Elements found in multiple extant manuscripts; these scholia derived from Proclus' commentary along with other commentaries that are now lost.

In the later Byzantine period, George Pachymeres wrote a summary of the quadrivium, and Maximus Planudes wrote scholia on the first two books of Diophantus' Arithmetica.

=== Greek mathematics in medieval Islam ===
Numerous mathematical treatises were translated into Arabic in the 9th century and beyond, and many ancient Greek mathematical works are only available today in Arabic translation. Nonetheless, there is evidence that several more that were translated have since been lost.

Medieval Islamic scientists such as Alhazen took up ancient Greek ideas to develop advanced theories in optics and astronomy, and Diophantus' Arithmetica found a welcome audience among those who read the works of Al-Khwarizmi and those of Indian mathematics to develop a theory of algebra.

The following works are extant only in Arabic translations:

- Apollonius, Conics (Books V–VII), Cutting Off of a Ratio
- Archimedes, Book of Lemmas
- Diocles, On Burning Mirrors
- Diophantus, Arithmetica (Books IV–VII)
- Euclid, On Divisions of Figures, On Weights
- Menelaus, Sphaerica
- Hero, Catoptrica, Mechanica
- Pappus, Collection (Book VIII), Commentary on Euclid's Elements (Book X)
- Ptolemy, Planisphaerium,

Ptolemy's Optics also survives in a Latin translation of the Arabic translation of a Greek original.

=== Greek mathematics in Latin Europe ===
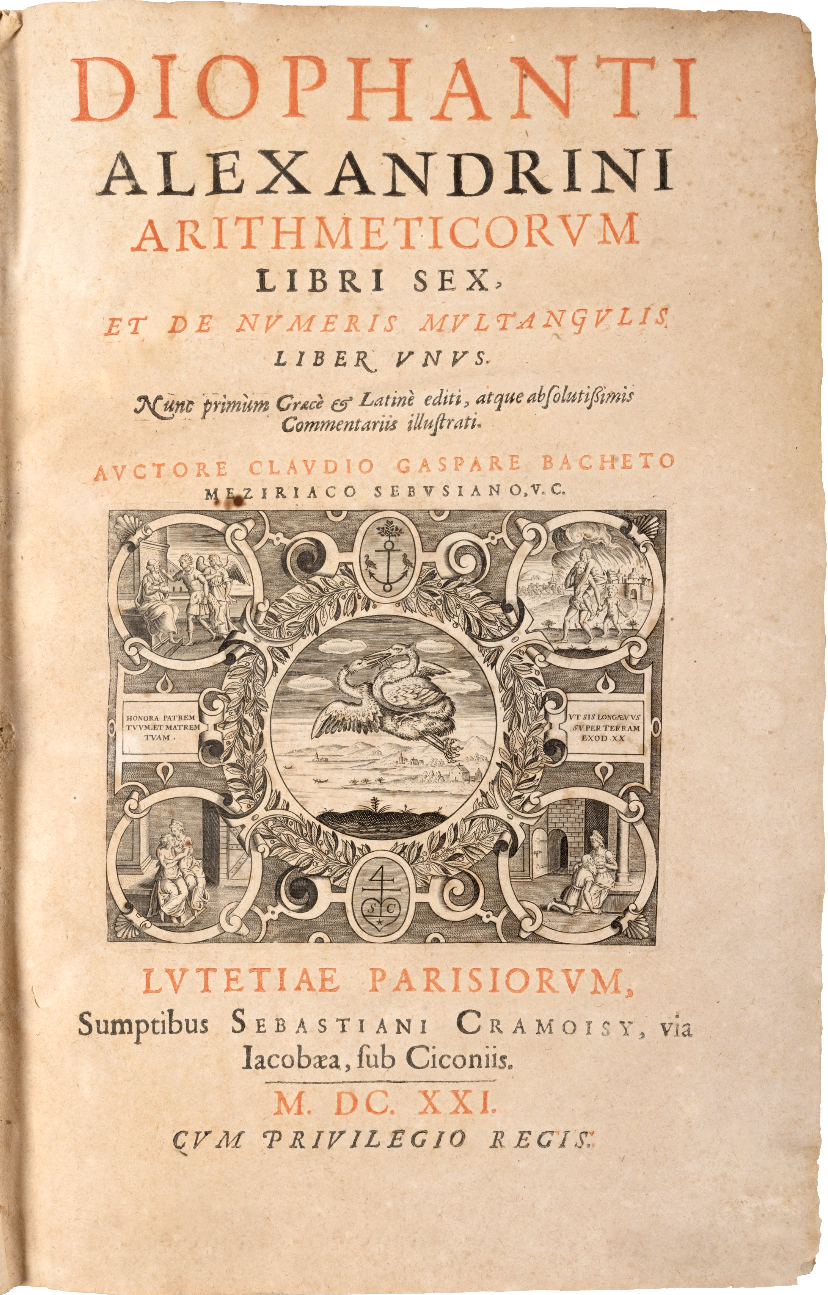
Cover of Diophantus' Arithmetica in Latin

The works derived from Ancient Greek mathematical writings that had been written in late antiquity by Boethius and Martianus Capella had formed the basis of early medieval quadrivium of arithmetic, geometry, astronomy, and music. In the 12th century the original works of Ancient Greek mathematics were translated into Latin first from Arabic by Gerard of Cremona, and then from the original Greek a century later by William of Moerbeke.

==== Renaissance ====
The publication of Greek mathematical works increased their audience; Pappus's collection was published in 1588, Diophantus in 1621. Diophantus would go on to influence Pierre de Fermat's work on number theory; Fermat scribbled his famous note about Fermat's Last Theorem in his copy of Arithmetica. Descartes, working through the Problem of Apollonius from his edition of Pappus, proved what is now called Descartes's theorem and laid the foundations for Analytic geometry.

==== Modern mathematics ====
Ancient Greek mathematics constitutes an important period in the history of mathematics: fundamental in respect of geometry and for the idea of formal proof. Greek mathematicians also contributed to number theory, mathematical astronomy, combinatorics, mathematical physics, and, at times, approached ideas close to the integral calculus.

Richard Dedekind acknowledged Eudoxus's theory of proportion as an inspiration for the Dedekind cut, a method of constructing the real numbers.

== See also ==
- Timeline of ancient Greek mathematicians
- List of Greek mathematicians
- Music of ancient Greece – Musical traditions of ancient Greece
