= Zenodorus (mathematician) =

Ancient Greek mathematician (c. 200–140 BC)

Zenodorus (Greek: Ζηνόδωρος; c. 200 – c. 140 BC) was an ancient Greek mathematician.

== Life and work ==
Little is known about the life of Zenodorus, although he may have befriended Philonides and made two trips to Athens, as described in Philonides' biography. From the style of his writing, it is known that he lived not much later than Archimedes.

He is mentioned in Diocles' On Burning Mirrors:

And when Zenodorus the astronomer came down to Arcadia and was introduced to us, he asked us how to find a mirror surface such that when it is placed facing the sun the rays reflected from it meet a point and thus cause burning.

Zenodorus is known for authoring the treatise On isoperimetric figures, now lost. Many of its propositions are known from Theon of Alexandria's commentary on Ptolemy's Syntaxis. In his On isoperimetric figures, Zenodorus studies the areas and perimeters of different geometric figures. The most important propositions proved by him are that,

1. Of all regular polygons of equal perimeter, that is the greatest in area which has the most angles.
2. A circle is greater than any regular polygon of equal contour.
3. Of all polygons of the same number of sides and equal perimeter the equilateral and equiangular polygon is the greatest in area.
4. Of all solid figures the surfaces of which are equal, the sphere is the greatest in solid content..
