= Theudius =

4th-century BC Greek mathematician

Theudius is a Greek mathematician of 4th century BCE, born in Magnesia, a member of the Platonic Academy and contemporary of Aristotle. He is only known from Proclus’ commentary to Euclid, where Theudius is said to have had "a reputation for excellence in mathematics as in the rest of philosophy, for he produced admirable "Elements" and made many partial theorems more general".

T. L. Heath suggests the Elements of Theudius was the textbook immediately proceeding that of Euclid. He thinks it probable that the propositions in elementary geometry quoted by Aristotle were taken from this Elements of Theudius. Heath also states that since Euclid's Elements satisfied all of Aristotle's requirements, it became the universal authority, so it was no wonder that prior collections of elements like those of Hippocrates of Chios, Theudius, and others were discarded immediately. It is possible these earlier Elements were preserved by Eudemus of Rhodes in his History of Geometry, where scholars presume Proclus received the source of this summary.

== Sources ==
- Thomas L. Heath (1921). A History of Greek Mathematics. Vol. 1.
- Euclid; Thomas L. Heath (1926). The thirteen books of Euclid's Elements. p. 117.
- Euclid; Thomas L. Heath (1949). Mathematics in Aristotle. p. 206.
- François Lasserre (1987). De Léodamas de Thasos à Philippe d'Oponte : témoignages et fragments. pp. 131–4. ISBN 8870881369.
