= Carpus of Antioch =

Ancient Greek mathematician

Carpus of Antioch (Greek: Κάρπος) was an ancient Greek mathematician. It is not certain when he lived; he may have lived any time between the 2nd century BC and the 2nd century AD. He wrote on mechanics, astronomy, and geometry. Proclus quotes from an Astronomical Treatise by Carpus concerning whether problems should come before theorems, in which Carpus may (or may not) have been criticising Geminus. Proclus also quotes the view of Carpus that "an angle is a quantity, namely a distance between the lines of surfaces containing it." According to Pappus, Carpus made use of mathematics for practical applications. According to Iamblichus, Carpus also constructed a curve for the purpose of squaring the circle, which he calls a curve generated by a double motion.
