= Aristaeus the Elder =

4th-century BC Greek mathematician

- Born: c. 370 BC
- Died: c. 300 BC

Aristaeus the Elder (Ancient Greek: Ἀρισταῖος ὁ Πρεσβύτερος; 370 – 300 BC) was an ancient Greek geometer and mathematician who worked on conic sections. He was a contemporary of Euclid.

== Life ==
Very little is known of his life, even his birthplace is unknown. The mathematician Pappus of Alexandria refers to him as Aristaeus the Elder. He seems to have been an outstanding geometer, on par with or even inspiring powerhouses like Euclid and Apollonius, but our knowledge of his achievements are incredibly limited, especially for someone apparently so important.

== Geometry ==
His contributions to geometry were set down in propositional axiomatic treatises akin to Euclid's Elements. His mathematical techniques must be surmised by fragments of his work and by later commentators.

=== Development of Analysis ===
Aristaeus was one of the main contributors to the field of ancient geometric analysis, standing beside Euclid and Apollonius. Pappus collected 32 of these mens’ works and put them in a curriculum known as the Treasury of Analysis. Aristaeus’s investigations amounted to five volumes of Solid Loci, or intermediate treatises on conic sections. Analysis sets out to deduce properties of pre-existing figures, one purpose being to find out how they are constructed. It is the opposite of synthesis, which sets out to construct objects with certain properties from nothing.

The analysis of Aristeus goes like this. Imagine you want to find a point on a line that satisfies a specific condition with respect to the line. Depending on the difficulty, attacking this problem through synthesis feels like shooting arrows in the dark. So instead of directly synthesizing the point and proving it has the property desired (which is the habit of Euclid), Aristaeus instead assumes the desired point is given. Then, he analyzes its properties to see if the point resides on a hyperbola or some other conic section. If so, then a construction of the necessary conic section will intersect the initial line and you will obtain the desired point. Now these theorems can be rewritten as synthesis proofs, but it hides the process of how the solution was found, and geometers will wonder how the theorem was discovered if they are not well versed in analysis. Archimedes was famous for obscuring his analytical techniques which is why his treatises appear so streamlined, thus his constructions and discoveries look like they were made through successive strokes of genius.

=== Conics ===
Aristaeus had a rudimentary view of conic sections. Instead of treating all the different ways a plane can intersect with a cone, he only considered the intersection of a cone with a plane perpendicular to its surface. Thus, he discovered three types of conic sections. One he called "the section of an acute-angled cone" (which is an ellipse), another he called "the section of a right-angled cone" (which is a parabola), and the last one he called "the section of an obtuse-angled cone" (which is a hyperbola).

When Apollonius took up the study of conics, this terminology perplexed him since every type of cone give rises to every type of conic section. Thus, he had to rename the conic sections "ellipse", "parabola", and "hyperbola", naming them after their properties, and not the type of cone that made them. By generalizing the definition, the circle became included among the sections of the cone when previously Aristaeus did not give recognize them.

Aristaeus made useful contributions to conics, for Pappus explains people used his loci to solve the duplication of the cube. Now this may have been Aristaeus himself, since Aristaeus seems to have solved the angle trisection problem using a hyperbola.

These curves were called solid loci, or lines that can only be generated by means of solids. The problems that could only be solved through solid loci were called solid problems. For instance, trisecting the angle and duplicating the cube required these special curves. To Plato's display, it would be later proven these problems cannot be solved by compass and straight-edge alone.

== Writings ==
Unfortunately, all of his works are lost, although some theorems may have been preserved by Pappus and Archimedes.

=== Solid Loci, in five books ===
Aristaeus's lost work on the Solid Loci was an intermediate treatise on conic sections. Because it was not introductory this inspired Apollonius to fully treat the basics of conics. Pappus lists the five Solid Loci as the next set of book sto read after Apollonius's eight Conics in his Treasury of Analysis. Even though only the title of this work survives, we can be sure pertained to conics because Pappus in another place describes it as "five books of conic elements".

=== Comparison of the Five Figures ===
A lost book that compared the regular polehedra when inscribed within the same spheres. Thomas Heath in his history of Greek mathematics notes, "Hypsicles (who lived in Alexandria) says also that Aristaeus, in a work entitled Comparison of the five figures, proved that the same circle circumscribes both the pentagon of the dodecahedron and the triangle of the icosahedron inscribed in the same sphere; whether this Aristaeus is the same as the Aristaeus of the Solid Loci, the elder contemporary of Euclid, we do not know." Current scholarship suggests that it was a genuine work of his. This book may have inspired Book XIII of Euclid's Elements. Apollonius also wrote a work on the same subject.

== Conical Fragments ==
Both Pappus and Archimedes appear to quote an ancient treatise on conics. It is postulated that they either come from Euclid or Aristaeus. Some argue Euclid did not write at all on conics, but if he did, it would have been a derivative work of Aristaeus.

The first three propositions in Archimedes's Quadrature of the Parabola are enunciations of previously proven theorems in the so-called Conic Elements which surely go back to Aristaeus.

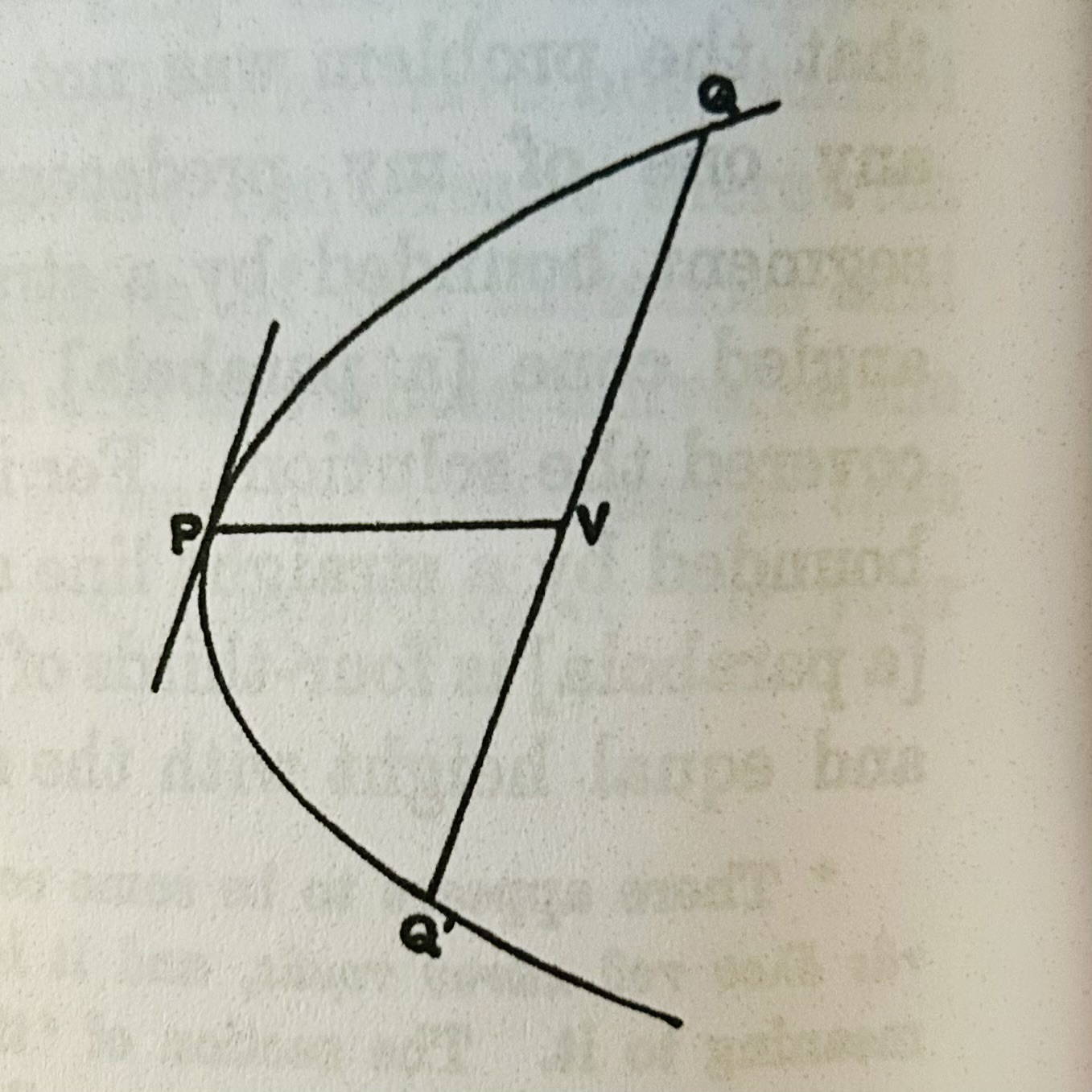

Proposition 1. If from a point on a parabola a straight line be drawn which is either itself the axis or parallel to the axis, as PV, and if QQ′ be a chord parallel to the tangent to the parabola at P and meeting in PV in V, then

QV = VQ′

Conversely, if QV = VQ', the chord QQ′ will be parallel to the tangent at P.

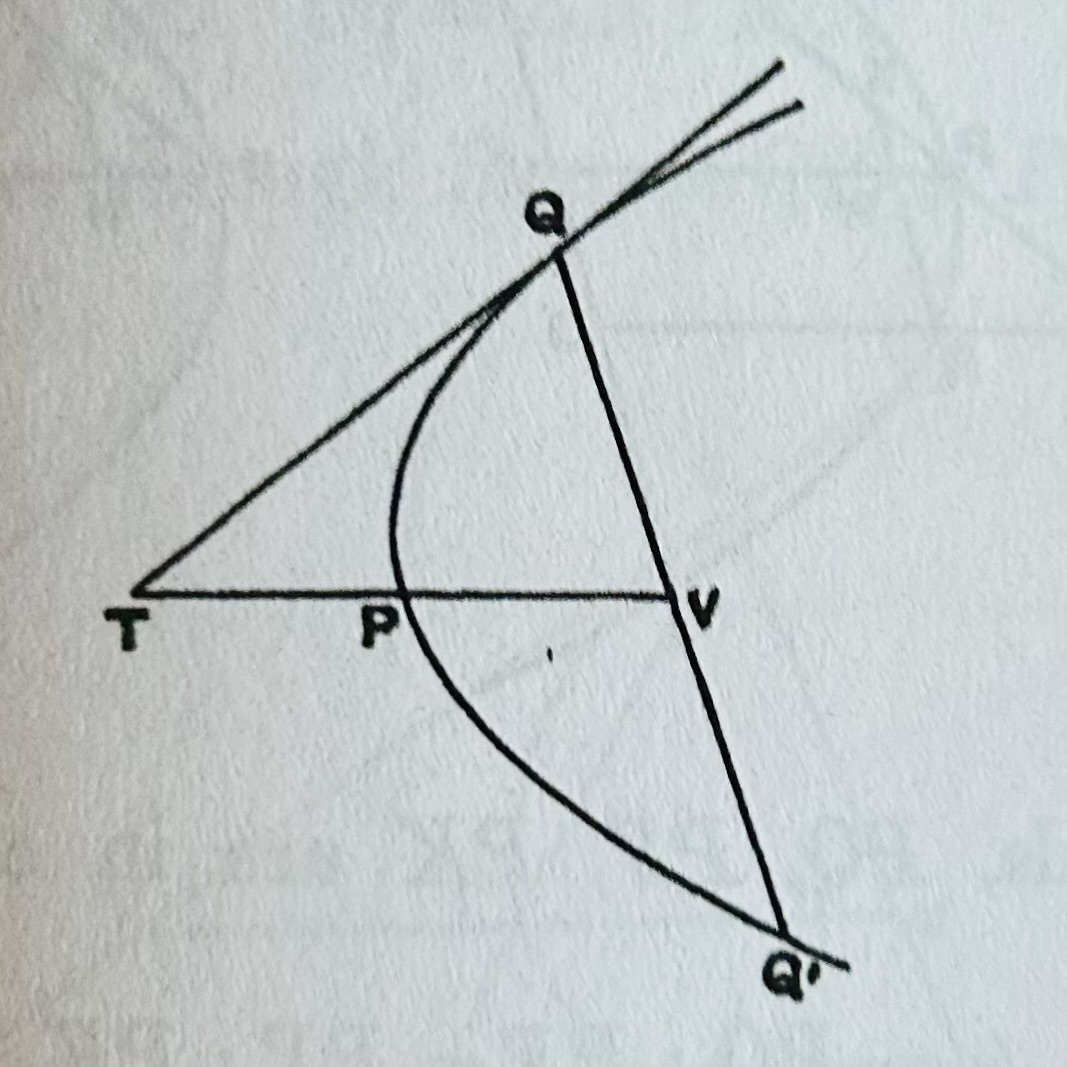

Proposition 2. If in a parabola QQ′ be a chord parallel to the tangent at P, and if a straight line be drawn through P which is either itself the axis or parallel to the axis, and which meets QQ′ in V and the tangent at Q to the parabola in T, then

PV = PT

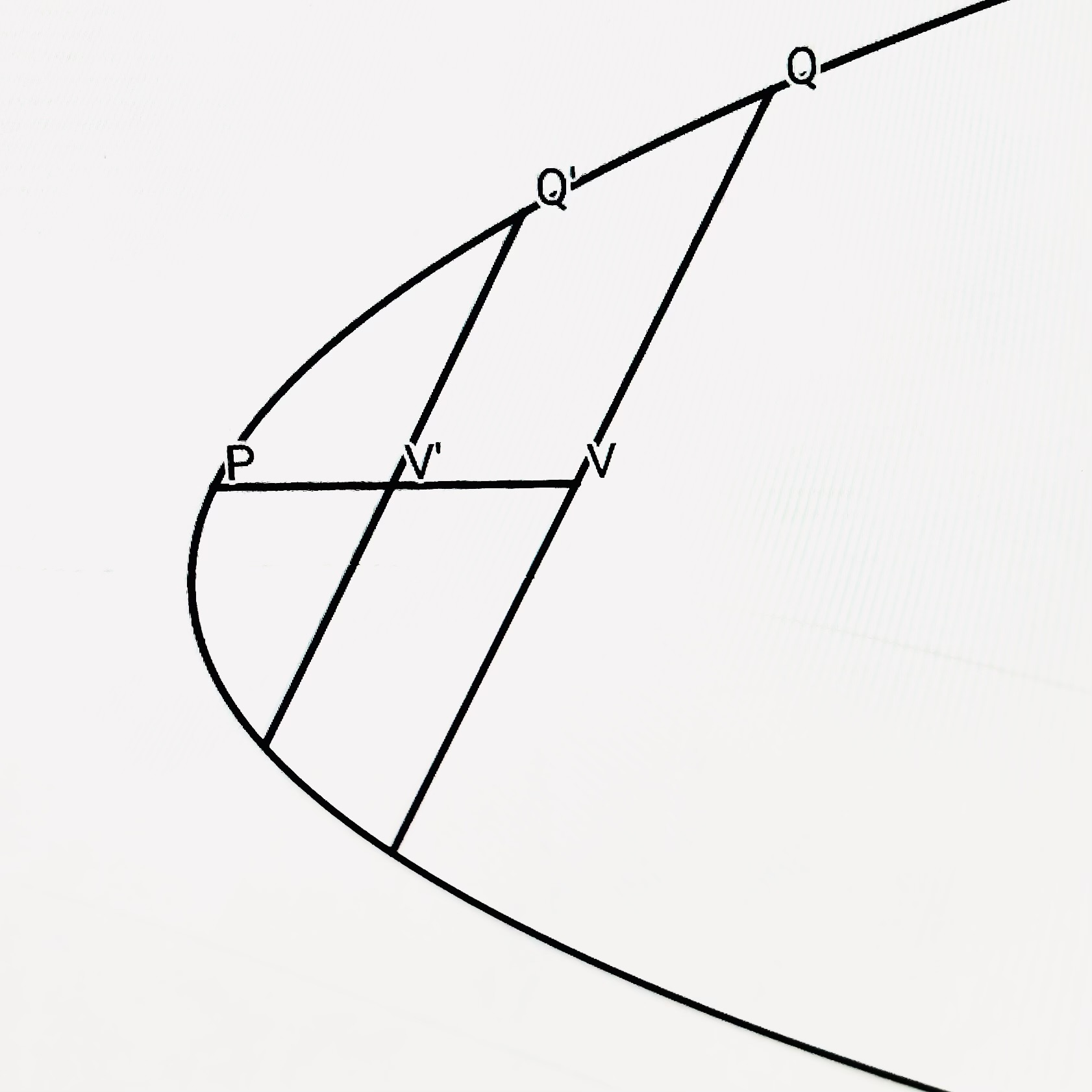

Proposition 3. If from a point on a parabola a straight line be drawn which is either itself the axis or parallel to the axis, as PV, and if from two other points Q, Q′ on the parabola line be drawn parallel to the tangent at P and meeting PV in V, V′ respectively, then

PV : PV′ = QV^{2} : Q′V′^{2}

"And these propositions are proved in the elements of conics."

The first statement of the third proposition in Archimedes's On Conoids and Spheroids again refers to a theorem in the Conic Elements.

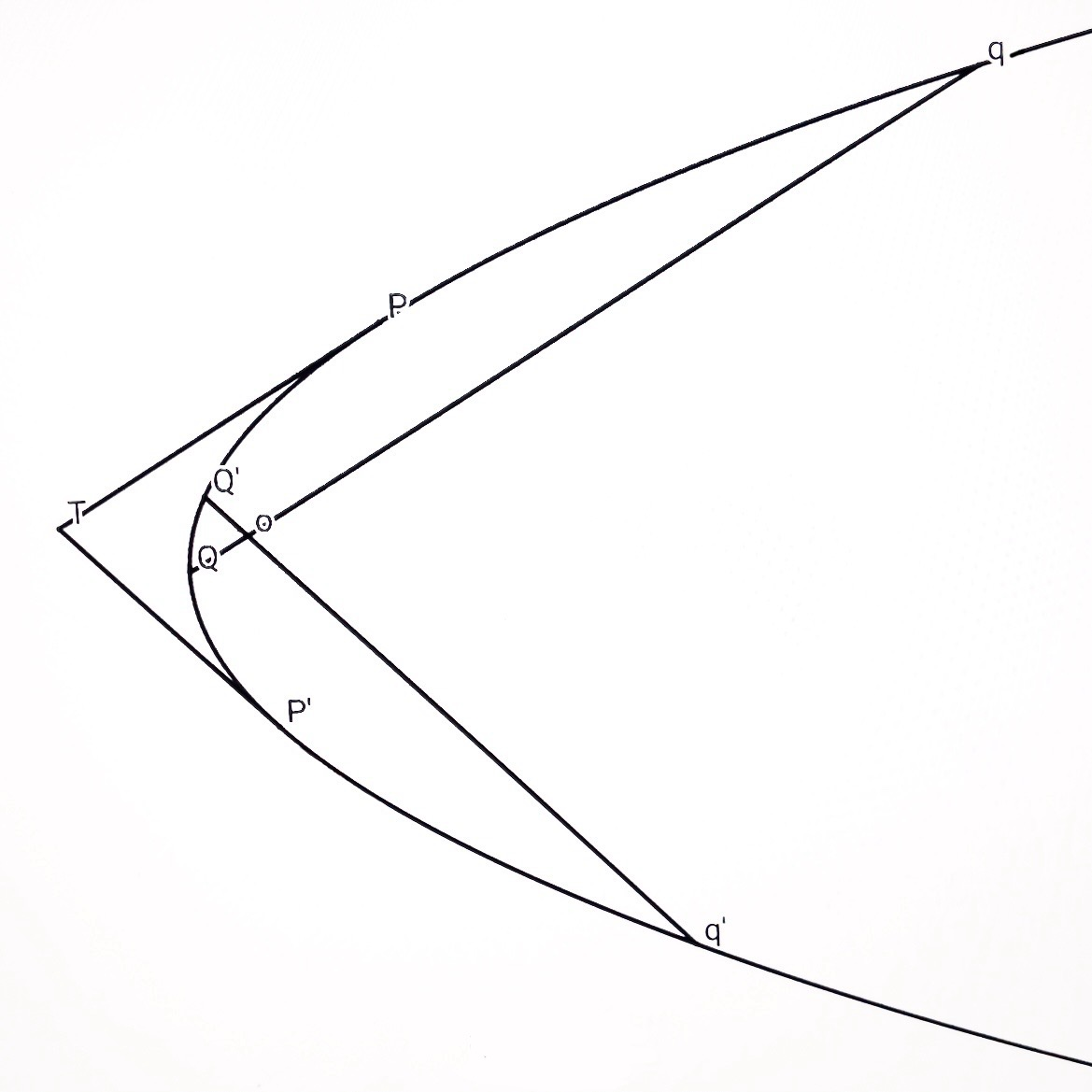

Proposition 3. If TP, TP′ be two tangents to any conic meeting in T, and if Qq, Q′q′ be any two chords parallel respectively to TP, TP′ and meeting in O, then

QO.Oq : Q′O.Oq′ = TP^{2} : TP′^{2}

"And this is proved in the elements of conics."

Some say an alternative to theorem 34 in Pappus's Collection IV goes back to Aristaeus. It is also one of the three times in all of preserved ancient Greek mathematics that preserves the focus directrix construction of conics.

Theorem 34b. Given an arc, its trisection point lies on a certain hyperbola.
