= Thymaridas =

4th-century BCE Greek mathematician

Thymaridas of Paros (Greek: Θυμαρίδας; c. 400 – c. 350 BCE) was an ancient Greek mathematician and Pythagorean noted for his work on prime numbers and simultaneous linear equations.

== Life and work ==
Although little is known about the life of Thymaridas, it is believed that he was a rich man who fell into poverty. It is said that Thestor of Poseidonia traveled to Paros in order to help Thymaridas with the money that was collected for him.

Iamblichus states that Thymaridas called prime numbers "rectilinear", since they can only be represented on a one-dimensional line. Non-prime numbers, on the other hand, can be represented on a two-dimensional plane as a rectangle with sides that, when multiplied, produce the non-prime number in question. He further called the number one a "limiting quantity".

Iamblichus in his comments to Introductio arithmetica states that Thymaridas also worked with simultaneous linear equations. In particular, he created the then famous rule that was known as the "bloom of Thymaridas" or as the "flower of Thymaridas", which states that:

If the sum of n quantities be given, and also the sum of every pair containing a particular quantity, then this particular quantity is equal to 1/(n + 2) [this is a typo in Flegg's book – the denominator should be n − 2 to match the math below] of the difference between the sums of these pairs and the first given sum.

or using modern notation, the solution of the following system of n linear equations in n unknowns:

$$\begin{align}
x + x_1 + x_2 + \cdots + x_{n-1} &= s, \\
x + x_1 &= m_1, \\
x + x_2 &= m_2, \\
&~~\vdots \\
x + x_{n-1} &= m_{n-1}
\end{align}$$

is given by

$$x = \frac{(m_1 + m_2 + \cdots + m_{n-1}) - s}{n - 2}.$$

Iamblichus goes on to describe how some systems of linear equations that are not in this form can be placed into this form.
