= Nicoteles of Cyrene =

Ancient Greek mathematician

Nicoteles of Cyrene (Greek: Νικοτέλης ὁ Κυρηναῖος) (c. 250 BC) was a Greek mathematician from Cyrene.

He is mentioned in the preface to Book 4 of the Conics of Apollonius, as criticising Conon concerning the maximum number of points with which a conic section can meet another conic section. Apollonius states that Nicoteles claimed that the case in which a conic section meets opposite sections could be solved, but had not demonstrated how.

It is possible that Nicoteles could be a misspelling of Nicomedes.
