= Philo line =

Type of line segment

In geometry, the Philo line is a line segment defined from an angle and a point inside the angle as the shortest line segment through the point that has its endpoints on the two sides of the angle. Also known as the Philon line, it is named after Philo of Byzantium, a Greek writer on mechanical devices, who lived probably during the 1st or 2nd century BC. Philo used the line to double the cube; because doubling the cube cannot be done by a straightedge and compass construction, neither can constructing the Philo line.

== Geometric characterization ==
The philo line of a point P and angle DOE, and the defining equality of distances from P and Q to the ends of DE, where Q is the base of a perpendicular from the apex of the angle

The defining point of a Philo line, and the base of a perpendicular from the apex of the angle to the line, are equidistant from the endpoints of the line. That is, suppose that segment $DE$ is the Philo line for point $P$ and angle $DOE$, and let $Q$ be the base of a perpendicular line $OQ$ to $DE$. Then $DP=EQ$ and $DQ=EP$.

Conversely, if $P$ and $Q$ are any two points equidistant from the ends of a line segment $DE$, and if $O$ is any point on the line through $Q$ that is perpendicular to $DE$, then $DE$ is the Philo line for angle $DOE$ and point $P$.

== Algebraic Construction ==
A suitable fixation of the line given the directions from $O$ to $E$ and from $O$ to $D$ and the location of $P$ in that infinite triangle is obtained by the following algebra:

The point $O$ is put into the center of the coordinate system, the direction from $O$ to $E$ defines the horizontal $x$-coordinate, and the direction from $O$ to $D$ defines the line with the equation $y{{=}}mx$ in the rectilinear coordinate system. $m$ is the tangent of the angle in the triangle $DOE$. Then $P$ has the Cartesian Coordinates $(P_x,P_y)$ and the task is to find $E=(E_x,0)$ on the horizontal axis and $D=(D_x,D_y)=(D_x,mD_x)$ on the other side of the triangle.

The equation of a bundle of lines with inclinations $\alpha$ that run through the point $(x,y)=(P_x,P_y)$ is

$$y=\alpha(x-P_x)+P_y.$$

These lines intersect the horizontal axis at

$$\alpha(x-P_x)+P_y=0$$

which has the solution

$$(E_x,E_y)=\left(P_x-\frac{P_y}{\alpha},0\right).$$

These lines intersect the opposite side $y=mx$ at

$$\alpha(x-P_x)+P_y=mx$$

which has the solution

$$(D_x,D_y)=\left(\frac{\alpha P_x-P_y}{\alpha-m},m\frac{\alpha P_x-P_y}{\alpha-m}\right).$$

The squared Euclidean distance between the intersections of the horizontal line and the diagonal is

$$ED^2 = d^2=(E_x-D_x)^2+(E_y-D_y)^2 = \frac{m^2(\alpha P_x-P_y)^2(1+\alpha^2)}{\alpha^2(\alpha-m)^2}.$$

The Philo Line is defined by the minimum of that distance at negative $\alpha$.

An arithmetic expression for the location of the minimum is obtained by setting the derivative $\partial d^2/\partial \alpha=0$, so

$$-2m^2\frac{(P_x\alpha -P_y)[(mP_x-P_y)\alpha^3+P_x\alpha^2-2P_y\alpha+P_ym]}{\alpha^3 (\alpha-m)^3}=0 .$$

So calculating the root of the polynomial in the numerator,

$$(mP_x-P_y)\alpha^3+P_x\alpha^2-2P_y\alpha+P_ym=0$$

determines the slope of the particular line in the line bundle which has the shortest length. [The global minimum at inclination $\alpha=P_y/P_x$ from the root of the other factor is not of interest; it does not define a triangle but means that the horizontal line, the diagonal and the line of the bundle all intersect at $(0,0)$.]

$-\alpha$ is the tangent of the angle $OED$.

Inverting the equation above as $\alpha_1=P_y/(P_x-E_x)$ and plugging this into the previous equation one finds that $E_x$ is a root of the cubic polynomial

$$mx^3+(2P_y-3mP_x)x^2+3P_x(mP_x-P_y)x-(mP_x-P_y)(P_x^2+P_y^2) .$$

So solving that cubic equation finds the intersection of the Philo line on the horizontal axis. Plugging in the same expression into the expression for the squared distance gives

$$d^2=
\frac{P_y^2+x^2-2xP_x+P_x^2}{(P_y+mx-mP_x)^2}
x^2m^2
.$$

=== Location of $Q$ ===
Since the line $OQ$ is orthogonal to $ED$, its slope is $-1/\alpha$, so the points on that line are $y=-x/\alpha$. The coordinates of the point $Q=(Q_x,Q_y)$ are calculated by intersecting this line with the Philo line, $y=\alpha(x-P_x)+P_y$. $\alpha(x-P_x)+P_y=-x/\alpha$ yields

$$Q_x=\frac{(\alpha P_x-P_y)\alpha}{1+\alpha^2}$$
$$Q_y=-Q_x/\alpha = \frac{P_y-\alpha P_x}{1+\alpha^2}$$

With the coordinates $(D_x,D_y)$ shown above, the squared distance from $D$ to $Q$ is

$$DQ^2 = (D_x-Q_x)^2+(D_y-Q_y)^2 = \frac{(\alpha P_x-P_y)^2(1+\alpha m)^2}{(1+\alpha^2)(\alpha-m)^2}$$.

The squared distance from $E$ to $P$ is

$$EP^2 \equiv (E_x-P_x)^2+(E_y-P_y)^2 = \frac{P_y ^2(1+\alpha^2)}{\alpha^2}$$.

The difference of these two expressions is

$$DQ^2-EP^2 = \frac{[(P_xm+P_y)\alpha^3+(P_x-2P_ym)\alpha^2-P_ym]
[(P_xm-P_y)\alpha^3+P_x\alpha^2-2P_y\alpha+P_ym]}{\alpha^2(1+\alpha^2)(a-m)^2}$$.

Given the cubic equation for $\alpha$ above, which is one of the two cubic polynomials in the numerator, this is zero. This is the algebraic proof that the minimization of $DE$ leads to $DQ=PE$.

==== Special case: right angle ====
The equation of a bundle of lines with inclination $\alpha$ that run through the point $(x,y)=(P_x,P_y)$, $P_x,P_y>0$, has an intersection with the $x$-axis given above. If $DOE$ form a right angle, the limit $m\to\infty$ of the previous section results in the following special case:

These lines intersect the $y$-axis at

$$\alpha(-P_x)+P_y$$

which has the solution

$$(D_x,D_y)=(0,P_y-\alpha P_x).$$

The squared Euclidean distance between the intersections of the horizontal line and vertical lines is

$$d^2=(E_x-D_x)^2+(E_y-D_y)^2 = \frac{(\alpha P_x-P_y)^2(1+\alpha^2)}{\alpha^2}.$$

The Philo Line is defined by the minimum of that curve (at negative $\alpha$). An arithmetic expression for the location of the minimum is where the derivative $\partial d^2/\partial \alpha=0$, so

$$2\frac{(P_x\alpha -P_y)(P_x\alpha^3+P_y)}{\alpha^3}=0$$

equivalent to

$$\alpha = -\sqrt[3]{P_y/P_x}$$

Therefore

$$d=\frac{P_y-\alpha P_x}{|\alpha|}\sqrt{1+\alpha^2}
=P_x[1+(P_y/P_x)^{2/3}]^{3/2}.$$

Alternatively, inverting the previous equations as $\alpha_1=P_y/(P_x-E_x)$ and plugging this into another equation above one finds

$$E_x=P_x+P_y\sqrt[3]{P_y/P_x}.$$

== Doubling the cube ==
The Philo line can be used to double the cube, that is, to construct a geometric representation of the cube root of two, and this was Philo's purpose in defining this line. Specifically, let $PQRS$ be a rectangle whose aspect ratio $PQ:QR$ is $1:2$, as in the figure. Let $TU$ be the Philo line of point $P$ with respect to right angle $QRS$. Define point $V$ to be the point of intersection of line $TU$ and of the circle through points $PQRS$. Because triangle $RVP$ is inscribed in the circle with $RP$ as diameter, it is a right triangle, and $V$ is the base of a perpendicular from the apex of the angle to the Philo line.

Let $W$ be the point where line $QR$ crosses a perpendicular line through $V$. Then the equalities of segments $RS=PQ$, $RW=QU$, and $WU=RQ$ follow from the characteristic property of the Philo line. The similarity of the right triangles $PQU$, $RWV$, and $VWU$ follow by perpendicular bisection of right triangles. Combining these equalities and similarities gives the equality of proportions $RS:RW = PQ:QU = RW:WV = WV:WU = WV:RQ$ or more concisely $RS:RW = RW:WV = WV:RQ$. Since the first and last terms of these three equal proportions are in the ratio $1:2$, the proportions themselves must all be $1:\sqrt[3]{2}$, the proportion that is required to double the cube.

Since doubling the cube is impossible with a straightedge and compass construction, it is similarly impossible to construct the Philo line with these tools.

== Minimizing the area ==
Given the point $P$ and the angle $DOE$, a variant of the problem may minimize the area of the triangle $OED$. With the expressions for $(E_x,E_y)$ and $(D_x,D_y)$ given above, the area is half the product of height and base length,

$$A = D_yE_x/2 =\frac{m(\alpha P_x-P_y)^2}{2\alpha(\alpha-m)}$$.

Finding the slope $\alpha$ that minimizes the area means to set $\partial A/\partial \alpha=0$,

$$- \frac{m(\alpha P_x-P_y)[(mP_x-2P_y)\alpha+P_ym]}{2\alpha^2(\alpha-m)^2}=0$$.

Again discarding the root $\alpha = P_y/P_x$ which does not define a triangle, the slope is in that case

$$\alpha = -\frac{mP_y}{mP_x-2P_y}$$

and the minimum area

$$A = \frac{2P_y(mP_x-P_y)}{m}$$.
