= Mihail Zervos =

Greek financial mathematician

- Education: Imperial College London, UK; National Technical University of Athens, Greece
- Scientific career
- Fields: Mathematical Finance, Optimal Stopping
- Workplaces: London School of Economics, UK
- Academic advisors: Mark Davis

Mihail Zervos is a Greek financial mathematician. He is Professor of Financial Mathematics at the London School of Economics.

== Curriculum ==
Zervos received his MSc and PhD degrees from Imperial College London in 1995. After completing his PhD, he was a lecturer at the Department of Statistics, University of Newcastle, where he stayed until 2000. He then joined King's College London, initially as a lecturer and then as a reader in the Department of Mathematics. In 2006 he was appointed to the chair in Financial Mathematics at the London School of Economics where he was tasked with founding a new Research Group in Financial Mathematics within the Departement of Mathematics.
