= Dionysodorus =

Ancient Greek mathematician (c. 250 BC – 190 BC)

Dionysodorus of Caunus (Ancient Greek: Διονυσόδωρος ὁ Καύνειος, c. 250 BC – c. 190 BC) was an ancient Greek mathematician.

== Life and work ==
Little is known about the life of Dionysodorus. Pliny the Elder writes about a Dionysodorus who measured the Earth's circumference, however he is probably the one from Melos and different both from the one from Caunus and from Dionysodorus of Amisene; Strabo differentiates between the latter two mathematicians.

Dionysodorus is remembered for solving the cubic equation by means of the intersection of a rectangular hyperbola and a parabola. Eutocius credits Dionysodorus with the method of cutting a sphere into a given ratio, as described by him. Heron mentions a work by Dionysauras entitled On the Tore, in which the volume of a torus is calculated and found to be equal to the area of the generating circle multiplied by the circumference of the circle created by tracing the center of the generating circle as it rotates about the torus's axis of revolution. Dionysodorus used Archimedes' methods to prove this result.

It is also likely that this Dionysodorus was the inventor of a conical sundial. Pliny's mentioning tells of an inscription placed on his tomb, addressed to the world above, stating that he had been to the centre of the Earth and found it 42 thousand stadia distant. Pliny calls this a striking instance of Greek vanity; but this figure compares well with the modern measurement.
