= Heliodorus of Larissa =

3rd-century Greek mathematician

Heliodorus of Larissa (fl. 3rd century?) was a Greek mathematician, and the author of a short treatise on optics which is still extant.

== Biography ==
Nothing is known about the life of Heliodorus. He was a native of Larissa, and he must have lived after the time of Claudius Ptolemy, whom he quotes. His short treatise on optics is little more than a commentary on Euclid. It was edited by one Damianus, who was either his son or his pupil. The first printed edition, in Greek and Latin, was published in Paris in 1657 with illustrative notes by Erasmus Bartholinus.

== Works ==
- Capita opticorum (in Latin). Pistoia: Atto Bracali. 1758.

== See also ==
- Domninus of Larissa
