= Diocles (mathematician) =

Ancient Greek mathematician (c. 240–180 BC)

Diocles (Ancient Greek: Διοκλῆς; c. 240 BC – c. 180 BC) was a Greek mathematician and geometer.

== Life and work ==
Although little is known about the life of Diocles, it is known that he was a contemporary of Apollonius and that he flourished sometime around the end of the 3rd century BC and the beginning of the 2nd century BC.

Diocles is thought to be the first person to prove the focal property of the parabola. His name is associated with the geometric curve called the Cissoid of Diocles, which was used by Diocles to solve the problem of doubling the cube. The curve was alluded to by Proclus in his commentary on Euclid and attributed to Diocles by Geminus as early as the beginning of the 1st century.

Fragments of a work by Diocles entitled On burning mirrors were preserved by Eutocius in his commentary of Archimedes' On the Sphere and the Cylinder and also survived in an Arabic translation of the lost Greek original titled Kitāb Dhiyūqlīs fī l-marāyā l-muḥriqa (lit. “The book of Diocles on burning mirrors”). Historically, On burning mirrors had a large influence on Arabic mathematicians, particularly on al-Haytham, the 11th-century polymath of Cairo whom Europeans knew as "Alhazen". The treatise contains sixteen propositions that are proved by conic sections. One of the fragments contains propositions seven and eight, which is a solution to the problem of dividing a sphere by a plane so that the resulting two volumes are in a given ratio. Proposition ten gives a solution to the problem of doubling the cube. This is equivalent to solving a certain cubic equation. Another fragment contains propositions eleven and twelve, which use the cissoid to solve the problem of finding two mean proportionals in between two magnitudes. Since this treatise covers more topics than just burning mirrors, it may be the case that On burning mirrors is the aggregate of three shorter works by Diocles. In the same work, Diocles, just after demonstrating that the parabolic mirror could focus the rays in a single point, he mentioned that It is possible to obtain a lens with the same property.
