= Isidore of Miletus =

5th-century Byzantine Greek architect and mathematician

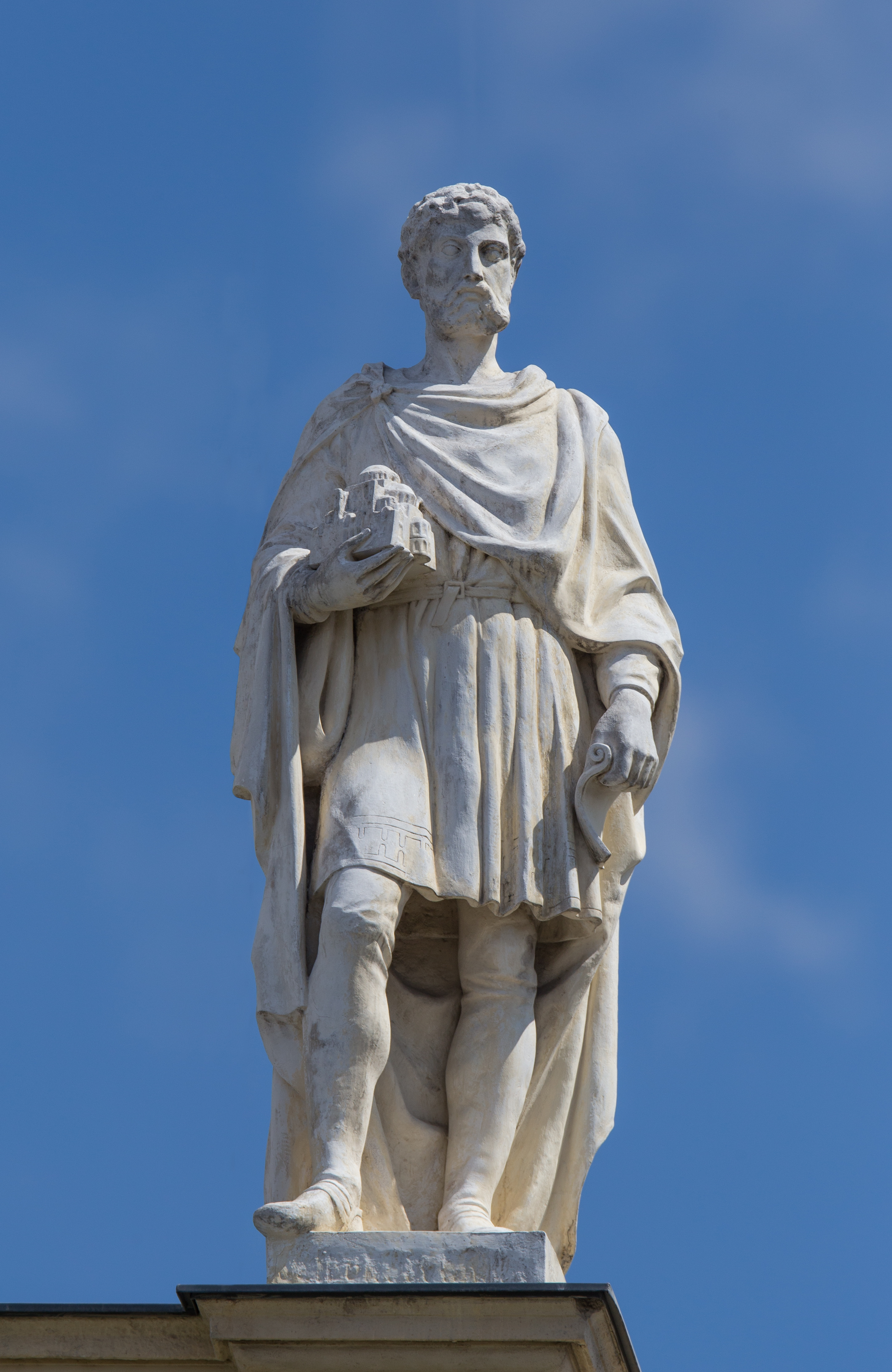
Roof figure by Ludwig Simek at the Kunsthistorisches Museum, Vienna (Museumsstraße)

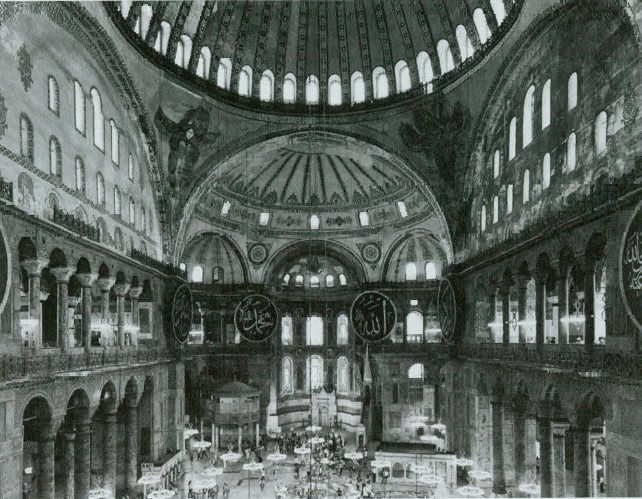
The vaults in the Hagia Sophia, originally designed by Isidore of Miletus.

Isidore of Miletus (Greek: Ἰσίδωρος ὁ Μιλήσιος; Medieval Greek pronunciation: [iˈsiðoros o miˈlisios]; Latin: Isidorus Miletus) was one of the two main Byzantine Greek mathematician, physicist and architects (Anthemius of Tralles was the other) that Emperor Justinian I commissioned to design the cathedral Hagia Sophia in Constantinople from 532 to 537. He was born c. 475 AD. The creation of an important compilation of Archimedes' works has been attributed to him. The spurious Book XV from Euclid's Elements has been partly attributed to Isidore of Miletus.

== Biography ==
Exterior of the Hagia Sophia, 2013

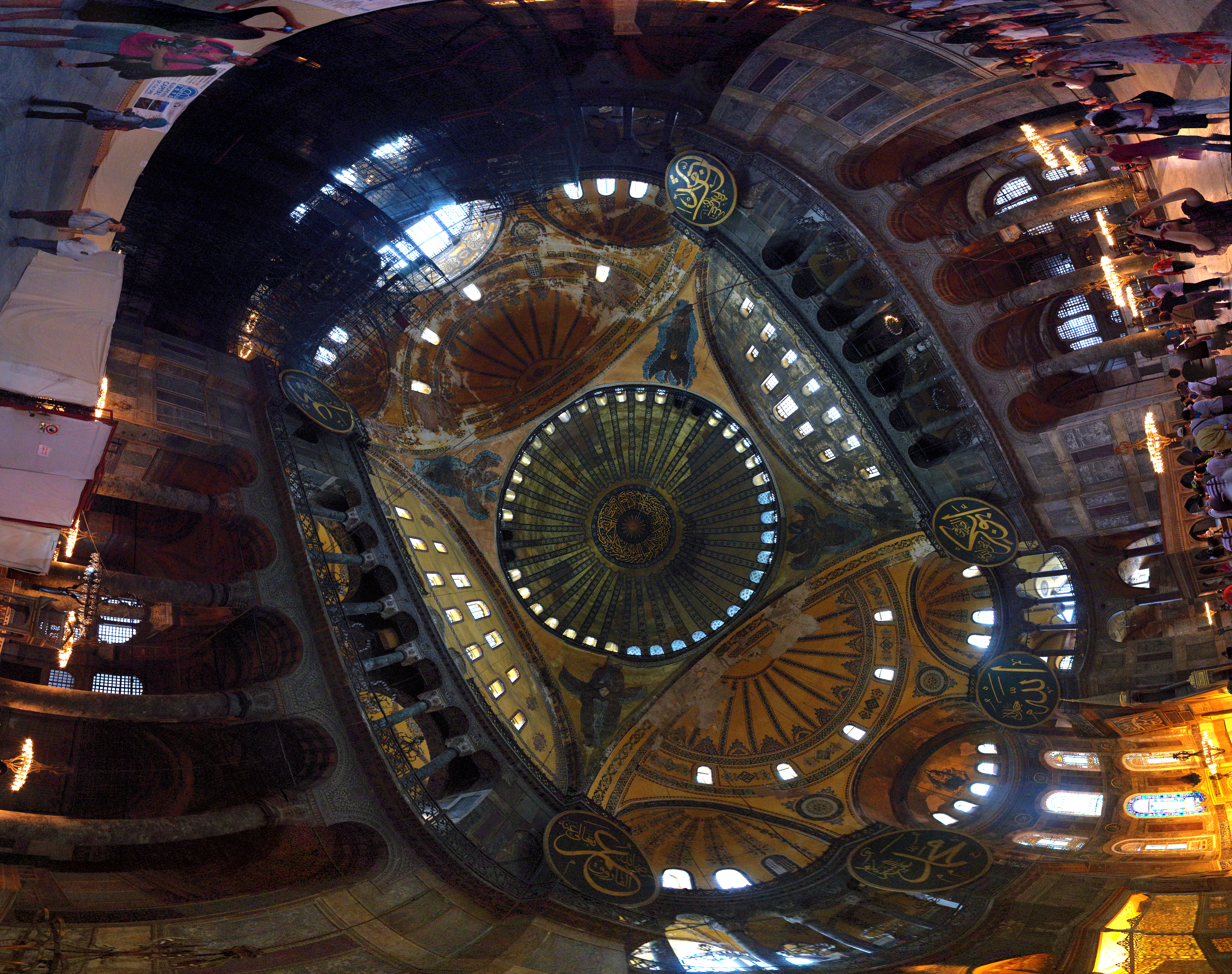
Interior panorama of the Hagia Sophia, the patriarchal basilica designed by Isidore. The influence of Archimedes' solid geometry works, which Isidore was the first to compile, is evident (annotated image).

Isidore of Miletus was a renowned scientist and mathematician before Emperor Justinian I hired him. Isidorus taught stereometry and physics at the universities of Alexandria and then of Constantinople, and wrote a commentary on an older treatise on vaulting. Eutocius together with Isidore studied Archimedes' work. Isidore is also renowned for producing the first comprehensive compilation of Archimedes' work, the Archimedes palimpsest survived to the present.

=== Teachings and writings ===
A majority of Isidore's preserved work are his edits and commentaries on older Greek mathematical texts. For example, Isidore is known to have revised and checked some of Archimedes' works and also Book XV of Euclid's elements.

That being said, claims from Alan Cameron have been made about a hypothetical "School of Isidore". Between his work on architectural exploits, Isidore taught about math and geometry of the time. The School of Isidore is supported more by the presence of his teaching's in much of his students (such as Eutocious) works rather than his own writings. In an edit of the fifteenth book of Euclid's Elements, for instance, the editor quotes Isidore, but then proceeds to explain that Isidore did not publish much of his work himself. Instead, he taught, and once he himself could understand the material, did not see a need to write it down. It is because of this that Cameron claims that Isidore helped to revitalize interest in ancient mathematicians in Constantinople and Alexandria circa 510.

In addition to editing the works of others, Isidore is known to have written his own commentary on Hero of Alexandria's "On Vaulting", which discussed aspects of vault construction and design in relation to geometry. While this commentary is lost Eutocius makes mention of it in his own writings. It is when referring to this work that Eutocius credits Isidore with designing a special compass for the purpose of drawing parabolas. Isidore's invention allowed for the drawing of parabolas with a greater level accuracy than that of which many previous methods were capable. From Eutocius (or his copyist) it is believed that one notable use for Isidores invention was to visually solve the problem of doubling the volume of a cube. This was said to be done by drawing two parabolas and finding the point where they intersect. In addition to their mathematical applications, Isidore is believed to have highlighted the uses of applying the use of parabolas to the construction of vaults.

=== Hagia Sophia ===
Emperor Justinian I appointed his architects to rebuild the Hagia Sophia following his victory over protesters within the capital city of the Roman Empire, Constantinople. The first basilica was completed in 360 and remodelled from 404 to 415, but had been damaged in 532 in the course of the Nika Riot, “The temple of Sophia, the baths of Zeuxippus, and the imperial courtyard from the Propylaia all the way to the so-called House of Ares were burned up and destroyed, as were both of the great porticoes that lead to the forum that is named after Constantine, houses of prosperous people, and a great deal of other properties.”

The rival factions of Constantinople's populace, the Blues and Greens, opposed each other in the chariot races at the Hippodrome and often resorted to violence. During the Nika Riot, more than thirty thousand people were killed. Emperor Justinian I ensured that his new structure would not be burned down, like its predecessors, by commissioning architects that would build the church mainly out of stone, rather than wood, “He compacted it of baked brick and mortar, and in many places bound it together with iron, but made no use of wood, so that the church should no longer prove combustible.” The construction of the Hagia Sophia began so fast after the riots were quelled that many think that Justinian had his architects begin planning it before the riots even stopped.

Isidore of Miletus and Anthemius of Tralles originally planned on a main hall of the Hagia Sophia that measured 70 by 75 metres (230 x 250 ft), making it the largest church in Constantinople, but the original dome was nearly 6 metres (20 ft) lower than it was constructed, “Justinian suppressed these riots and took the opportunity of marking his victory by erecting in 532-7 the new Hagia Sophia, one of the largest, most lavish, and most expensive buildings of all time.”

Although Isidore of Miletus and Anthemius of Tralles were not formally educated in architecture, they were scientists who could organize the logistics of drawing thousands of labourers and unprecedented loads of rare raw materials from around the Roman Empire to construct the Hagia Sophia for Emperor Justinian I. Isidore and Anthemius obtained stone from as far away as Egypt, Syria, and Libya, and columns from several temples in Rome. The finished product was built in admirable form for the Roman Emperor, “All of these elements marvellously fitted together in mid-air, suspended from one another and reposing only on the parts adjacent to them, produce a unified and most remarkable harmony in the work, and yet do not allow the spectators to rest their gaze upon any one of them for a length of time.” It is believed that Isidore did much of the work on the domes of the Hagia Sophia due to his extensive work on vaults, and his commentary, "On Vaulting".

The Hagia Sophia architects innovatively combined the longitudinal structure of a Roman basilica and the central plan of a drum-supported dome, in order to withstand the high magnitude earthquakes of the Marmara region, “However, in May 558, little more than 20 years after the Church’s dedication, following the earthquakes of August 553 and December 557, parts of the central dome and its supporting structure system collapsed.” The Hagia Sophia was repeatedly cracked by earthquakes and was quickly repaired. Isidore of Miletus’ nephew, Isidore the Younger, introduced the new dome design that can be viewed in the Hagia Sophia in present-day Istanbul, Turkey. Originally the dome was constructed without ribs, but achieved its present-day construction with ribs when Isidore the Younger repaired the church.

After a great earthquake in 989 ruined the dome of Hagia Sophia, the Byzantine officials summoned Trdat the Architect to Byzantium to organize repairs. The restored dome was completed by 994.

== Sources ==
- Cakmak, AS; Taylor, RM; Durukal, E (2009). "The Structural Configuration of the First Dome of Justinian's Hagia Sophia (AD 537–558): An Investigation Based on Structural and Literary Analysis". Soil Dynamics and Earthquake Engineering. 29 (4): 693–698. doi:10.1016/j.soildyn.2008.07.007.
- Cameron, Alan (Spring 1990). Isidore of Miletus and Hypatia: On the Editing of Mathematical Texts (Volume 31, Issue 1). Cambridge: Greek, Roman, and Byzantine Studies.
- Cavendish, Richard (December 2013). "Church of Hagia Sophia reconsecrated". History Today.
- Krautheimer, Richard (1965). Early Christian and Byzantine Architecture. Baltimore: Penguin Books. ISBN 978-0-300-05294-7.
- Mango, Cyril A. (1972). The Art of the Byzantine Empire, 312-1453: Sources and Documents. Englewood Cliffs, New Jersey: Prentice-Hall. ISBN 0-8020-6627-5.
- Maranci, Christina (September 2003). "The Architect Trdat: Building Practices and Cross-Cultural Exchange in Byzantium and Armenia". The Journal of the Society of Architectural Historians. 62 (3): 294–305. doi:10.2307/3592516. JSTOR 3592516.
- Martines, Giangiacomo (2014). "Isidore's Compass: A Scholium by Eutocius on Hero's Treatise On Vaulting". Nuncius: Journal of the Material and Visual History of Science: 279–311.
- Podles, Mary Elizabeth (May 2021). "A Thousand Words Hagia Sophia, Church of the Holy Wisdom". Touchstone: A Journal of Mere Christianity.
- Prokopios (2010). Anthony Kaldellis (ed.). The Secret History: With Related Texts. Indianapolis: Hackett Publishing. ISBN 978-1-60384-180-1.
- Watkin, David (1986). A History of Western Architecture. New York: Thames and Hudson. ISBN 978-1-85669-459-9.
