= Philonides of Laodicea =

Ancient Greek philosopher and mathematician (c. 200–130 BC)

Philonides (Ancient Greek: Φιλωνίδης, c. 200 – c. 130 BCE) of Laodicea in Syria, was an Epicurean philosopher and mathematician who lived in the Seleucid court during the reigns of Antiochus IV Epiphanes and Demetrius I Soter.

He is known principally from a Life of Philonides, which was discovered among the charred papyrus scrolls at the Villa of the Papyri at Herculaneum. Philonides was born into a family with good connections with the Seleucid court. He is said to have been taught by Eudemus and Dionysodorus the mathematician. Philonides attempted to convert Antiochus IV Epiphanes to Epicureanism, and later instructed his nephew, Demetrius I Soter, in philosophy. Philonides was highly honoured in the court, and he is also known from various stone inscriptions.

He was renowned as a mathematician, and is mentioned by Apollonius of Perga in the preface to the second book of his Conics.

Philonides was a zealous collector of the works of Epicurus and his colleagues, and is said to have published over 100 treatises, probably compilations of the works he collected.
