= Pandrosion =

4th-century AD mathematician

Pandrosion of Alexandria (Ancient Greek: Πανδροσίων) was a mathematician in fourth-century-AD Alexandria, discussed in the Mathematical Collection of Pappus of Alexandria and known for having possibly developed an approximate method for doubling the cube. She is likely the earliest known female mathematician.

== Contributions ==
Doubling the cube is calculating a cube with double the volume of another.

Pappus dedicated a section of his Collection to correcting what he perceives as errors in Pandrosion's students. Although Pappus does not directly state that the method is Pandrosion's, he includes in this section a method for calculating numerically accurate but approximate solutions to the problem of doubling the cube, or more generally of calculating cube roots. It is a "recursive geometric" solution, but three-dimensional rather than working within the plane. Pappus criticized this work as lacking a proper mathematical proof. Another method included in the same section, and potentially attributable in the same way indirectly to Pandrosion, is a correct and exact method for constructing the geometric mean, simpler than the method used by Pappus.

== Name and gender ==
The name Pandrosion is a diminutive of Pandrosos, the name of a daughter of the first king of Athens; it means "all-dewy". As such, it has been described as "not likely as a man's name".

When Friedrich Hultsch prepared his 1878 translation of Pappus's Collection from Greek into Latin, the manuscript of the Collection that he used referred to Pandrosion using a feminine form of address. Hultsch decided that this must have been a mistake, and referred to Pandrosion as masculine in his translation. However, the 1988 English translation of Pappus by Alexander Raymond Jones "argued convincingly" that the original feminine form was not a mistake, and more recent scholarship has followed Jones in taking the position that Pandrosion was a woman.

Hypatia has often been called the first woman to have contributed to mathematics, but Pappus died before the earliest suggested birth date of Hypatia. Therefore, Pandrosion is a likely candidate for an earlier female contributor to mathematics than Hypatia. Pandrosion was also described by Pappus as a teacher of mathematics, and although Pappus recorded only men among her students, Edward J. Watts suggests that Hypatia may have known of, or even known, Pandrosion.
