= Serenus of Antinoöpolis =

Greek mathematician (c. 300–360)

Serenus of Antinoöpolis (Ancient Greek: Σερῆνος; c. 300 – c. 360 AD) was a Greek mathematician from the Late Antique Thebaid in Roman Egypt.

== Life and work ==
Serenus came either from Antinoeia or from Antinoöpolis, a city in Egypt founded by Hadrian on top of an older settlement. Two sources confirm that he was born in Antinoöpolis. It was once believed that he was born in Antissa, but this has been shown to have been based on an error.

Serenus wrote a commentary on the Conics of Apollonius, which is now lost. We hear from Theon of Alexandria that the main result of the commentary was that of a number of angles that are subtended at a point on a diameter of a circle that is not the center, then with equal arcs of that circle, the angle nearer to the center is always less than the angle farther away from the center. But he was also a prime mathematician in his own right, having written two works entitled On the Section of a Cylinder and On the Section of a Cone, works that came to be connected to Apollonius' Conics. This connection helped them to survive through the ages.

In the preface of On the Section of a Cylinder, Serenus states that his motivation for writing this work, as summarized by Heath, was that "many persons who were students of geometry were under the erroneous that the oblique section of a cylinder was different from the oblique section of a cone known as an ellipse, whereas it is of course the same curve." The work consists of thirty-three propositions.

- Proposition six proves the existence an oblique cylinder of the parallel circular sections subcontrary to the series of which the bases are two.
- Proposition nine proves that the section by any plane not parallel to that of the bases or of one of the subcontrary sections but cutting all the generators is not a circle.
- Propositions fourteen and sixteen, the main results, are follow ups of the previous propositions where the said section is proved to have the property of the ellipse.
- Proposition seventeen puts the property that was found in propositions fourteen and sixteen into the Apollonian form using the latus rectum.
- Propositions twenty-nine to thirty-three deal with an optical problem. He gives a definition of parallels that was generally ridiculed.

In propositions one though fifty-seven of On the Section of a Cone, Serenus deals largely with the areas of triangular sections of right and scalene cones that are created by planes passing through the vertex. He shows when the area of a triangle of a certain class of triangles is at its maximum. Propositions fifty-eight through sixty-nine form a separate section of the book and deal with the volumes of right cones in relation to their heights, their bases and the areas of triangular sections through the axis.
