= Anthemius of Tralles =

Byzantine architect and mathematician (c. 474 – 533–558)

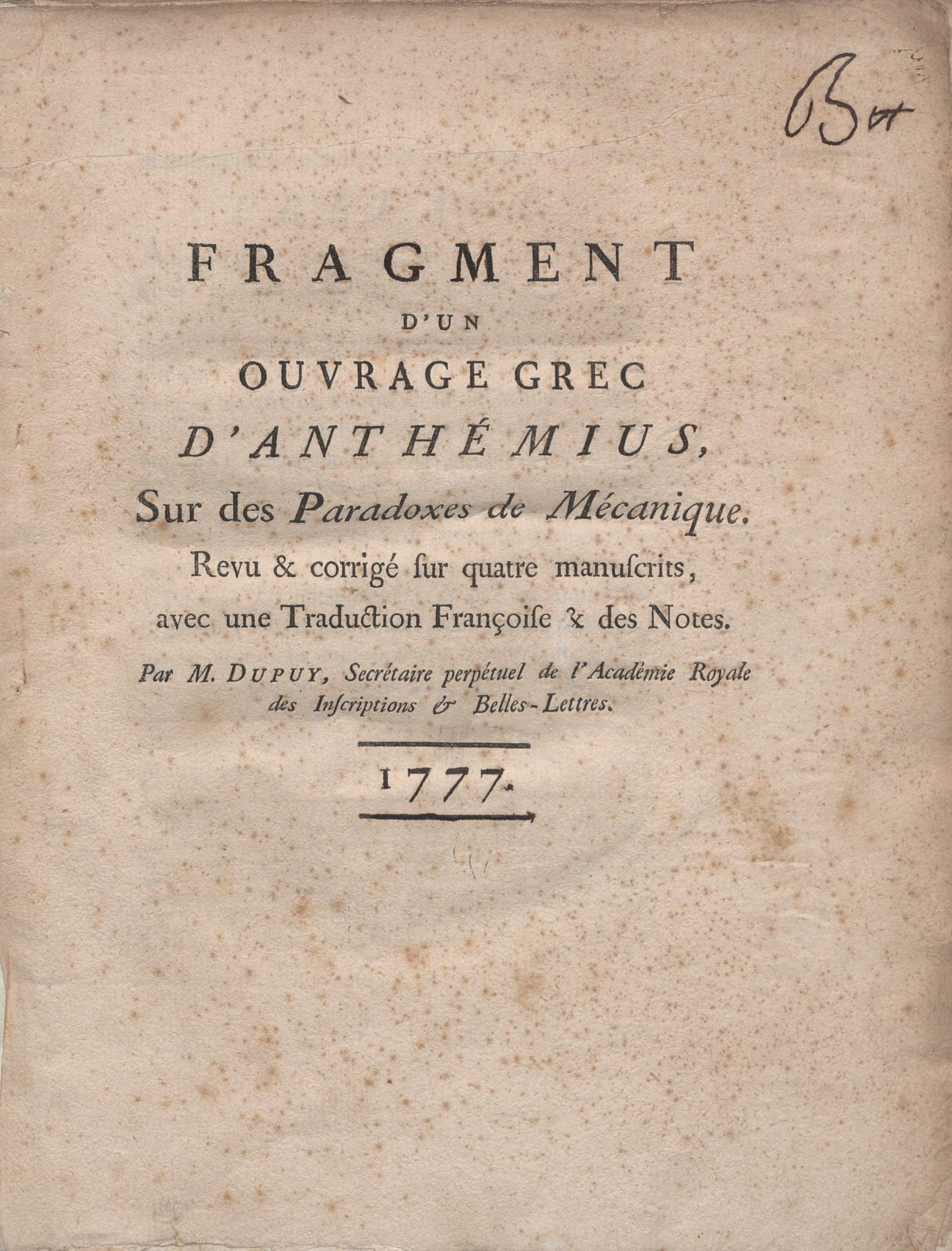
Fragment of a Greek work by Anthemius on Paradoxes of mechanics (Fragment d'un ouvrage grec d'Anthèmius sur des Paradoxes de mècanique), 1777

Anthemius of Tralles (Ancient Greek: Ἀνθέμιος ὁ Τραλλιανός, Medieval Greek: [anˈθemios o traliaˈnos], Anthémios o Trallianós; c. 474 – 533 x 558) was a Byzantine Greek from Tralles who worked as a geometer and architect in Constantinople, the capital of the Byzantine Empire. With Isidore of Miletus, he designed the Hagia Sophia for Justinian I.

== Life ==
Anthemius was one of the five sons of Stephanus of Tralles, a physician. His brothers were Dioscorus, Alexander, Olympius, and Metrodorus. Dioscorus followed his father's profession in Tralles; Alexander did so in Rome and became one of the most celebrated medical men of his time; Olympius became a noted lawyer; and Metrodorus worked as a grammarian in Constantinople.

Anthemius was said to have annoyed his neighbor Zeno in two ways: first, by engineering a miniature earthquake by sending steam through leather tubes he had fixed among the joists and flooring of Zeno's parlor while he was entertaining friends and, second, by simulating thunder and lightning and flashing intolerable light into Zeno's eyes from a slightly hollowed mirror. In addition to his familiarity with steam, some dubious authorities credited Anthemius with a knowledge of gunpowder or other explosive compound.

== Mathematics ==
Anthemius was a capable mathematician. In the course of his treatise On Burning Mirrors, he intended to facilitate the construction of surfaces to reflect light to a single point, he described the string construction of the ellipse and assumed a property of ellipses not found in Apollonius of Perga's Conics: the equality of the angles subtended at a focus by two tangents drawn from a point. His work also includes the first practical use of the directrix: having given the focus and a double ordinate, he used the focus and directrix to obtain any number of points on a parabola. This work was later known to Arab mathematicians such as Alhazen.

Eutocius of Ascalon's commentary on Apollonius's Conics was dedicated to Anthemius.

== Architecture ==
Exterior of the Hagia Sophia, 2013

As an architect, Anthemius is best known for his work designing the Hagia Sophia. He was commissioned with Isidore of Miletus by Justinian I shortly after the earlier church on the site burned down in 532 but died early on in the project. He is also said to have repaired the flood defenses at Daras.

== Editions of On Burning-Glasses ==
- Dupuy, L. (1777), Περί παραδόξων μηχανημάτων [Perí Paradóxōn Mēkhanēmátōn; Concerning Wondrous Machines] (in Greek)
- Histoire de l'Academie des Instrumentistes (in French), vol. XLII
- Westermann, A. (1839), Παραδοξογράφοι [Paradoxográphoi; Marvel-Writers] (in Greek)
