= Hypsicles =

Ancient Greek mathematician and astronomer (c. 190–120 BC)

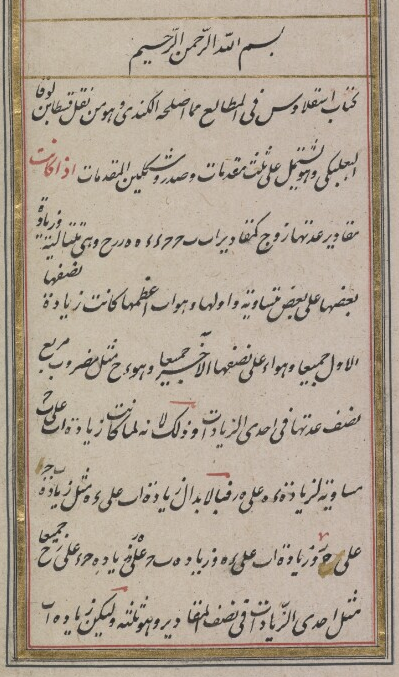
Arabic translation of Hypsicles (AD 1783/4), Kitāb Isqilawus fī maṭāli‘ ('Book of Hypsicles on Rising Times', called Anaphoricus in the West).

Hypsicles (Ancient Greek: Ὑψικλῆς, romanized: Hypsiklēs; c. 190 – c. 120 BCE) was an ancient Greek mathematician and astronomer known for authoring On Ascensions (Ἀναφορικός) and possibly the Book XIV of Euclid's Elements. Hypsicles lived in Alexandria.

== Life and work ==
Although little is known about the life of Hypsicles, it is believed that he authored the astronomical work On Ascensions. The mathematician Diophantus of Alexandria noted on a definition of polygonal numbers, due to Hypsicles:

If there are as many numbers as we please beginning from 1 and increasing by the same common difference, then, when the common difference is 1, the sum of all the numbers is a triangular number; when 2 a square; when 3, a pentagonal number [and so on]. And the number of angles is called after the number which exceeds the common difference by 2, and the side after the number of terms including 1.

=== On Ascensions ===
In On Ascensions (Ἀναφορικός and sometimes translated On Rising Times), Hypsicles proves a number of propositions on arithmetical progressions and uses the results to calculate approximate values for the times required for the signs of the zodiac to rise above the horizon. It is thought that this is the work from which the division of the circle into 360 parts may have been adopted since it divides the day into 360 parts, a division possibly suggested by Babylonian astronomy, although this is mere speculation and no actual evidence is found to support this. Heath 1921 notes, "The earliest extant Greek book in which the division of the circle into 360 degrees appears".

This work by Hypsicles is believed to represent the earliest extant Greek text to use the Babylonian division of the zodiac into 12 signs of 30 degrees each.

=== Euclid's Elements ===
Hypsicles is more famously known for possibly writing the Book XIV of Euclid's Elements. The book may have been composed on the basis of a treatise by Apollonius. The book continues Euclid's comparison of regular solids inscribed in spheres, with the chief result being that the ratio of the surfaces of the dodecahedron and icosahedron inscribed in the same sphere is the same as the ratio of their volumes, the ratio being $\sqrt{\frac{10}{3(5-\sqrt{5})}}$.

Heath further notes, "Hypsicles says also that Aristaeus, in a work entitled Comparison of the five figures, proved that the same circle circumscribes both the pentagon of the dodecahedron and the triangle of the icosahedron inscribed in the same sphere; whether this Aristaeus is the same as the Aristaeus of the Solid Loci, the elder (Aristaeus the Elder) contemporary of Euclid, we do not know."

== Hypsicles letter ==
Hypsicles letter was a preface of the supplement taken from Euclid's Book XIV, part of the thirteen books of Euclid's Elements, featuring a treatise.

Basilides of Tyre, O Protarchus, when he came to Alexandria and met my father, spent the greater part of his sojourn with him on account of the bond between them due to their common interest in mathematics. And on one occasion, when looking into the tract written by Apollonius (Apollonius of Perga) about the comparison of the dodecahedron and icosahedron inscribed in one and the same sphere, that is to say, on the question what ratio they bear to one another, they came to the conclusion that Apollonius' treatment of it in this book was not correct; accordingly, as I understood from my father, they proceeded to amend and rewrite it. But I myself afterwards came across another book published by Apollonius, containing a demonstration of the matter in question, and I was greatly attracted by his investigation of the problem. Now the book published by Apollonius is accessible to all; for it has a large circulation in a form which seems to have been the result of later careful elaboration. For my part, I determined to dedicate to you what I deem to be necessary by way of commentary, partly because you will be able, by reason of your proficiency in all mathematics and particularly in geometry, to pass an expert judgment upon what I am about to write, and partly because, on account of your intimacy with my father and your friendly feeling towards myself, you will lend a kindly ear to my disquisition. But it is time to have done with the preamble and to begin my treatise itself.
