= Thomas Heath (classicist) =

British civil servant, mathematician and classicist (1861–1940)

Sir Thomas Little Heath KCB KCVO FRS FBA
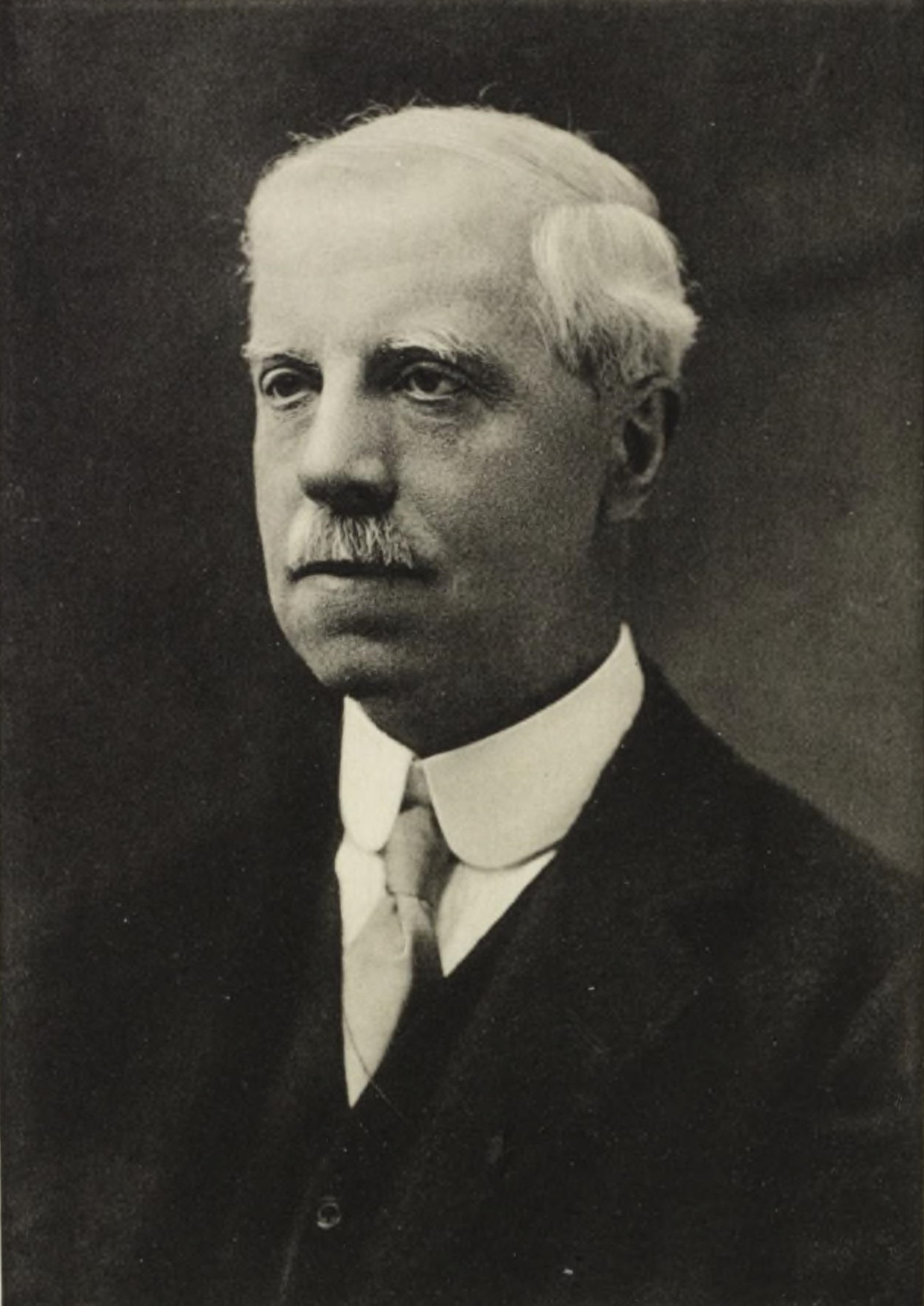
- Heath c. 1910
- Born: 5 October 1861; Barnetby-le-Wold, North Lincolnshire, England
- Died: 16 March 1940 (aged 78); Ashtead, Surrey, England
- Education: Clifton College
- Alma mater: Trinity College, Cambridge
- Occupations: British civil servant; mathematician; classical scholar
- Notable work: Archimedes: Works; The thirteen books of Euclid's Elements (translation); A History of Greek Mathematics (for full list, see below)
- Spouse: Ada Mary Thomas
- Children: Geoffrey Thomas Heath; Veronica Mary Heath
- Parent(s): Samuel Heath; Mary Little
- Awards: Knight Commander of the Order of the Bath; Knight Commander of the Royal Victorian Order; Fellow of the Royal Society

Sir Thomas Little Heath KCB KCVO FRS FBA (/hiːθ/; 5 October 1861 – 16 March 1940) was a British civil servant, mathematician, classical scholar, historian of ancient Greek mathematics, translator, and mountaineer. He was educated at Clifton College in Bristol. Heath translated works of Euclid of Alexandria, Apollonius of Perga, Aristarchus of Samos, and Archimedes of Syracuse into English.

== Life ==
Heath was born in Barnetby-le-Wold, Lincolnshire, England, being the third son of a farmer, Samuel Heath, and his wife Mary Little. He had two brothers and three sisters. He was educated at Caistor Grammar School and Clifton College before entering Trinity College, Cambridge, where he was awarded an ScD in 1896 and became an Honorary Fellow in 1920. He got first class honours in both the classical tripos and mathematical tripos and was the twelfth wrangler in 1882. In 1884 he took the Civil Service examination and became an Assistant Secretary to the Treasury, finally becoming Joint Permanent Secretary to the Treasury and auditor of the Civil List in 1913. He held the position till 1919 when he was appointed as the comptroller of the National Debt Office, from which he retired at the end of 1926 because of age limitations.

Heath was honoured for his work in the Civil Service by being appointed Companion of the Order of the Bath in 1903, Knight Commander of the Order of the Bath in 1909, and Knight Commander of the Royal Victorian Order in 1916. He was elected a Fellow of the Royal Society in 1912. He was a president of the Mathematical Association in 1922-23, and a fellow of the British Academy.

He had married professional musician Ada Mary Thomas in 1914; they had a son, Geoffrey Thomas Heath, and a daughter, Veronica Mary Heath. Heath's son Geoffrey went to Trinity College, Cambridge, before becoming a teacher at Ampleforth College, and had 6 children.

Heath died in Ashtead, Surrey, on 16 March 1940.

== Work ==
Heath was distinguished for his work in ancient Greek mathematics and was the author of several books on ancient Greek mathematics. It is primarily through Heath's translations that modern English-speaking readers are aware of what Archimedes did. His translation of the celebrated Archimedes Palimpsest, however, was based on a transcription that had lacunae, which scholars such as Reviel Netz have been able to fill in to a certain extent, by exploiting scientific methods of imagery not available in Heath's time.

When Heath's Works of Archimedes was published in 1897, the Archimedes Palimpsest had not been extensively explored. Its significance was not recognised until 1906, when it was examined by Danish professor Johan Ludvig Heiberg. The palimpsest contained an extended version of Stomachion, and a treatise entitled The Method of Mechanical Theorems that had previously been thought lost. These works have been a focus of research by later scholars.

== Translations and other works ==
Note: Only first editions are listed; many of these titles have been reprinted several times.

- Diophantus of Alexandria: a Study in the History of Greek Algebra (Cambridge: Cambridge University Press, 1885)
- Apollonius of Perga: Treatise on Conic Sections (Cambridge: Cambridge University Press, 1896)
- Archimedes: Works (Cambridge: Cambridge University Press, 1897)
- The thirteen books of Euclid's Elements (Cambridge: Cambridge University Press, 1908; 2nd ed., rev. with additions, 1926)
- Aristarchus of Samos, the Ancient Copernicus Oxford: Clarendon Press, 1913)
- Euclid in Greek, Book I, With Introduction and Notes (Cambridge: Cambridge University Press, 1920)
- A History of Greek Mathematics, in two volumes (Oxford: Clarendon Press, 1921)
- A Manual of Greek Mathematics (Oxford: Clarendon Press, 1931)
- Greek Astronomy (London: J.M. Dent & Sons, 1932)
- Mathematics in Aristotle (Oxford: Clarendon Press, 1949)
