= Isaac Argyros =

14th-century Byzantine mathematician and monk

- Born: c. 1312
- Died: c. 1375
- Scientific career
- Fields: Astronomy; Mathematics; Theology
- Academic advisors: Nikephoros Gregoras

Isaac Argyros (Greek: Ἰσαὰκ Ἀργυρός; c. 1312 – c. 1375) was a Byzantine mathematician and monk who wrote a treatise named Easter Rule, along with books on arithmetic, geometry and astronomy.

== Works ==
- An Easter Rule, a treatise on Easter
- New Tables: An Astronomical treatise, based on Ptolemaic astronomy
- On the participation in God
- On the transformation of the Saviour's Light

== Bibliography ==
- Boiadjiev, Tzotcho (2019). "Isaak Argyros". In: Brungs, Alexander; Kapriev, Georgi; Mudroch, Vilem (eds). Die Philosophie des Mittelalters 1: Byzanz, Judentum [The Philosophy of the Middle Ages 1: Byzantium, Judaism]. Grundriss der Geschichte der Philosophie, new edition. Basel: Schwabe, ISBN 978-3-7965-2623-7, pp. 144-145.
- Science and Civilisation in China, Volume 3: Mathematics and the Sciences of the Heavens and the Earth, Joseph Needham, Cambridge University Press 1959, ISBN 978-0521058018
