= Doubling the cube =

Ancient geometric construction problem

A unit cube (side = 1) and a cube with twice the volume (side = $\sqrt[3]{2}$ = 1.2599210498948732... OEIS: A002580).

Doubling the cube, also known as the Delian problem, is an ancient (Note: The Delian problem shows up in Plato's Republic (c. 380 BC) VII.530) geometric problem. Given the edge of a cube, the problem requires the construction of the edge of a second cube whose volume is double that of the first. As with the related problems of squaring the circle and trisecting the angle, doubling the cube is now known to be impossible to construct by using only a compass and straightedge, but even in ancient times, solutions were known that employed other methods.

According to Eutocius, Archytas was the first to solve the problem of doubling the cube, with an ingenious geometric construction. The nonexistence of a compass-and-straightedge solution was finally proven by Pierre Wantzel in 1837.

In algebraic terms, doubling a unit cube requires the construction of a line segment of length x, where x^{3} = 2; in other words, x = $\sqrt[3]{2}$, the cube root of two. This is because a cube of side length 1 has a volume of 1^{3} = 1, and a cube of twice that volume (a volume of 2) has a side length of the cube root of 2. The impossibility of doubling the cube is therefore equivalent to the statement that $\sqrt[3]{2}$ is not a constructible number. This is a consequence of the fact that the coordinates of a new point constructed by a compass and straightedge are roots of polynomials over the field generated by the coordinates of previous points, of no greater degree than a quadratic. This implies that the degree of the field extension generated by a constructible point must be a power of 2. The field extension generated by $\sqrt[3]{2}$, however, is of degree 3.

== Proof of impossibility ==
We begin with the unit line segment defined by points (0,0) and (1,0) in the plane. We are required to construct a line segment defined by two points separated by a distance of $\sqrt[3]{2}$. It is easily shown that compass and straightedge constructions would allow such a line segment to be freely moved to touch the origin, parallel with the unit line segment - so equivalently we may consider the task of constructing a line segment from (0,0) to ($\sqrt[3]{2}$, 0), which entails constructing the point ($\sqrt[3]{2}$, 0).

Respectively, the tools of a compass and straightedge allow us to create circles centred on one previously defined point and passing through another, and to create lines passing through two previously defined points. Any newly defined point either arises as the result of the intersection of two such circles, as the intersection of a circle and a line, or as the intersection of two lines. An exercise of elementary analytic geometry shows that in all three cases, both the x- and y-coordinates of the newly defined point satisfy a polynomial of degree no higher than a quadratic, with coefficients that are additions, subtractions, multiplications, and divisions involving the coordinates of the previously defined points (and rational numbers). Restated in more abstract terminology, the new x- and y-coordinates have minimal polynomials of degree at most 2 over the subfield of $\mathbb{R}$ generated by the previous coordinates. Therefore, the degree of the field extension corresponding to each new coordinate is 2 or 1.

So, given a coordinate of any constructed point, we may proceed inductively backwards through the x- and y-coordinates of the points in the order that they were defined until we reach the original pair of points (0,0) and (1,0). As every field extension has degree 2 or 1, and as the field extension over $\mathbb{Q}$ of the coordinates of the original pair of points is clearly of degree 1, it follows from the tower rule that the degree of the field extension over $\mathbb{Q}$ of any coordinate of a constructed point is a power of 2.

Now, p(x) = x^{3} − 2 = 0 is easily seen to be irreducible over $\mathbb{Z}$ – any factorisation would involve a linear factor (x − k) for some $k \isin \mathbb{Z}$, and so k must be a root of p(x); but also k must divide 2 (by the rational root theorem); that is, k = 1, 2, −1 or −2, and none of these are roots of p(x). By Gauss's Lemma, p(x) is also irreducible over $\mathbb{Q}$, and is thus a minimal polynomial over $\mathbb{Q}$ for $\sqrt[3]{2}$. The field extension $\mathbb{Q} (\sqrt[3]{2}):\mathbb{Q}$ is therefore of degree 3. But 3 is not a power of 2, so by the above:

- $\sqrt[3]{2}$ is not the coordinate of a constructible point, so
- a line segment of $\sqrt[3]{2}$ cannot be constructed with ruler and compass, and
- the cube cannot be doubled using only a ruler and a compass.

== History ==
The problem owes its name to a story concerning the citizens of Delos, who consulted the oracle at Delphi in order to learn how to defeat a plague sent by Apollo. According to Plutarch, however, the citizens of Delos consulted the oracle at Delphi to find a solution for their internal political problems at the time, which had intensified relationships among the citizens. The oracle responded that they must double the size of the altar to Apollo, which was a regular cube. The answer seemed strange to the Delians, and they consulted Plato, who was able to interpret the oracle as the mathematical problem of doubling the volume of a given cube, thus explaining the oracle as the advice of Apollo for the citizens of Delos to occupy themselves with the study of geometry and mathematics in order to calm down their passions.

According to Plutarch, Plato gave the problem to Eudoxus and Archytas and Menaechmus, who solved the problem using mechanical means, earning a rebuke from Plato for not solving the problem using pure geometry. This may be why the problem is referred to in the 350s BC by the author of the pseudo-Platonic Sisyphus (388e) as still unsolved. However another version of the story (attributed to Eratosthenes by Eutocius of Ascalon) says that all three found solutions but they were too abstract to be of practical value.

A significant development in finding a solution to the problem was the discovery by Hippocrates of Chios that it is equivalent to finding two geometric mean proportionals between a line segment and another with twice the length. In modern notation, this means that given segments of lengths a and 2a, the duplication of the cube is equivalent to finding segments of lengths r and s so that

$$\frac{a}{r} = \frac{r}{s} = \frac{s}{2a} .$$

In turn, this means that

$$r=a\cdot\sqrt[3]{2}.$$

But Pierre Wantzel proved in 1837 that the cube root of 2 is not constructible; that is, it cannot be constructed with straightedge and compass.

== Solutions via means other than compass and straightedge ==
Menaechmus' original solution involves the intersection of two conic curves. Other more complicated methods of doubling the cube involve neusis, the cissoid of Diocles, the conchoid of Nicomedes, or the Philo line. Pandrosion, a probably female mathematician of ancient Greece, found a numerically accurate approximate solution using planes in three dimensions, but was heavily criticized by Pappus of Alexandria for not providing a proper mathematical proof. Archytas solved the problem in the 4th century BC using geometric construction in three dimensions, determining a certain point as the intersection of three surfaces of revolution.

Descartes's theory of geometric solution of equations uses a parabola to introduce cubic equations, in this way it is possible to set up an equation whose solution is a cube root of two. Note that the parabola itself is not constructible except by three dimensional methods.

False claims of doubling the cube with compass and straightedge abound in mathematical crank literature (pseudomathematics).

Origami may also be used to construct the cube root of two by folding paper.

=== Using a marked ruler ===

There is a simple neusis construction using a marked ruler for a length which is the cube root of 2 times another length.

1. Mark a ruler with the given length; this will eventually be GH.
2. Construct an equilateral triangle ABC with the given length as each side.
3. Extend AB an equal amount again to D.
4. Extend the line BC forming the line CE.
5. Extend the line DC forming the line CF.
6. Place the marked ruler so it goes through A and one end, G, of the marked length falls on ray CF and the other end of the marked length, H, falls on ray CE. Thus GH is the given length.

Then AG is the given length times $\sqrt[3]{2}$.

== In music theory ==
In music theory, a natural analogue of doubling is the octave (a musical interval caused by doubling the frequency of a tone), and a natural analogue of a cube is dividing the octave into three parts, each the same interval. In this sense, the problem of doubling the cube is solved by the major third in equal temperament. This is a musical interval that is exactly one third of an octave. It multiplies the frequency of a tone by $2^{4/12}=2^{1/3}=\sqrt[3]{2}$, the side length of the Delian cube.
