= Domninus of Larissa =

Syrian mathematician (c. 420 – c. 480)

Domninus of Larissa (Greek: Δομνῖνος; c. 420 – c. 480) was an ancient Hellenistic Syrian mathematician.

== Life ==
Domninus of Larissa, Syria was, simultaneously with Proclus, a pupil of Syrianus. Domninus is said to have corrupted the doctrines of Plato by mixing up with them his private opinions. This called forth a treatise from Proclus, intended as a statement of the genuine principles of Platonism. Marinus writes about a rivalry between Domninus and Proclus about how Plato's work should be interpreted,

[Syrianus] offered to discourse to them on either the Orphic theories or the oracles; but Domninus wanted Orphism, Proclus the oracles, and they had not agreed when Syrianus died...

The Athenian academy eventually choose Proclus' interpretation over Domninus' and Proclus would later become the head of the academy. After Proclus' promotion, Domninus left Athens and returned to Larissa.

It is said that once when Domninus was ill and coughing up blood, he took to eating copious amounts of pork, despite the fact that he was Jewish, because a physician prescribed it as a treatment. He is also said to have taught Asclepiodotus, until Asclepiodotus became so argumentative that Domninus no longer admitted him into his company.

== Writings ==
Domninus is remembered for authoring a Manual of Introductory Arithmetic (Greek: Ἐγχειρίδιον ἀριθμητικῆς εἰσαγωγῆς), which was edited by Boissonade and had two articles by Tannery written about it. The Manual of Introductory Arithmetic was a concise and well arranged overview of the theory of numbers. It covered numbers, proportions and means. It is important since it is a reaction against Nicomachus' Introductio arithmetica and a return to the doctrine of Euclid.

Domninus is also believed to have authored a tract entitled how a ratio can be taken out of a ratio (Greek: Πῶς ἔστι λόγον ἐκ λόγου ἀφελεῖν), which studies the manipulation of ratios into other forms. Bulmer-Thomas believe that it was written, at least in part, by Domninus, but Heath casts some doubt on the authorship by stating that if it wasn't written by Domninus then it at least comes from the same period as him. Domninus may have also written a work entitled Elements of Arithmetic as referred to near the end of his Manual of Introductory Arithmetic, although whether or not he ever wrote this book is unknown.

== See also ==
- Heliodorus of Larissa
