= Geminus =

Ancient Greek astronomer and mathematician (fl. 1st-century BC)

- Γεμῖνος ὁ Ῥόδιος
- Known for: Astronomer and mathematician
- Scientific career
- Academic advisors: Posidonius

Geminus of Rhodes (Greek: Γεμῖνος ὁ Ῥόδιος) was a Greek astronomer and mathematician, who flourished in the 1st century BC. An astronomy work of his, the Introduction to the Phenomena, survives; it was intended as an introductory astronomy book for students. He also wrote a work on mathematics, of which only fragments quoted by later authors survive.

== Life ==
Nothing is known about the life of Geminus. It is not even certain that he was born in Rhodes, but references to mountains on Rhodes in his astronomical works suggests that he worked there. His dates are not known with any certainty either. A passage in his works referring to the Annus Vagus (Wandering Year) of the Egyptian calendar of 120 years before his own time, has been used to imply a date of c. 70 BC for the time of writing, which would be consistent with the idea that he may have been a pupil of Posidonius, but a date as late as 50 AD has also been suggested.

== Astronomy ==
The only work of Geminus to survive is his Introduction to the Phenomena (Greek: Εἰσαγωγὴ εἰς τὰ Φαινόμενα), often just called the Isagoge. This introductory astronomy book, based on the works of earlier astronomers such as Hipparchus, was intended to teach astronomy for beginning students in the subject. In it, Geminus describes the zodiac and the motion of the Sun, the constellations, the celestial sphere, days and nights, the risings and settings of the zodiacal signs, luni-solar periods and their application to calendars, phases of the Moon, eclipses, star phases, terrestrial zones and geographical places, and the foolishness of making weather predictions by the stars.

He also wrote a commentary on Posidonius' work On Meteorology. Fragments of this commentary are preserved by Simplicius in his commentary on Aristotle's Physics.

== Mathematics ==
Geminus also wrote extensively on mathematics, including a comprehensive Doctrine, (or Theory) of Mathematics. Although this work has not survived, many extracts are preserved by Proclus, Eutocius, and others. He divided mathematics into two parts: Mental (Greek: νοητά) and Observable (Greek: αἰσθητά), or in other words, Pure and Applied. In the first category he placed geometry and arithmetic (including number theory), and in the second category he placed mechanics, astronomy, optics, geodesy, canonics (musical harmony), and logistics. Long extracts of his work are also preserved by Al-Nayrizi in his commentary on Euclid's Elements.

== Bibliography ==
- Evans, J., Berggren, J.L., Geminos's Introduction to the Phenomena: A Translation and Study of a Hellenistic Survey of Astronomy. (Princeton University Press, 2006.)
