= Eutocius of Ascalon =

5th–6th century Greek mathematician

Eutocius of Ascalon (/juːˈtoʊʃəs/; Greek: Εὐτόκιος ὁ Ἀσκαλωνίτης; c. 480s – c. 520s) was a Greek mathematician who wrote commentaries on several Archimedean treatises and on the Apollonian Conics.

== Life and work ==
Little is known about the life of Eutocius. He was born in Ascalon, then in Palestina Prima and lived during the reign of Justinian. Eutocius probably became the head of the Alexandrian school following Ammonius, and he was succeeded in this position by Olympiodorus, possibly as early as 525. From his testimony, it seems he traveled to other cultural centers of his time to find missing manuscripts.

Eutocius wrote commentaries on Apollonius and Archimedes. The surviving commentaries are:

- A Commentary on the first four books of the Conics of Apollonius.
- Commentaries on Archimedes' work:
  - On the Sphere and Cylinder I-II.
  - Measurement of the Circle (Latin: In Archimedis Dimensionem Circuli).
  - On the Equilibrium of Planes I-II.
- An introduction to Book I of Ptolemy's Almagest.

Historians owe much of their knowledge of Archimedes' solution of a cubic by means of intersecting conics, alluded to in On the Sphere and Cylinder, to Eutocius and his commentaries. Eutocius dedicated his commentary on Apollonius' Conics to Anthemius of Tralles, also a mathematician and the architect of the Hagia Sophia in Constantinople.

== Sources ==
- Boyer, Carl Benjamin (1991). A History of Mathematics (Second ed.). John Wiley & Sons, Inc. ISBN 0-471-54397-7.
- Watts, Edward J. (2006). City and School in Late Antique Athens and Alexandria. University of California Press. ISBN 978-0-520-25816-7.
