= Archimedes Palimpsest =

Greek parchment codex manuscript

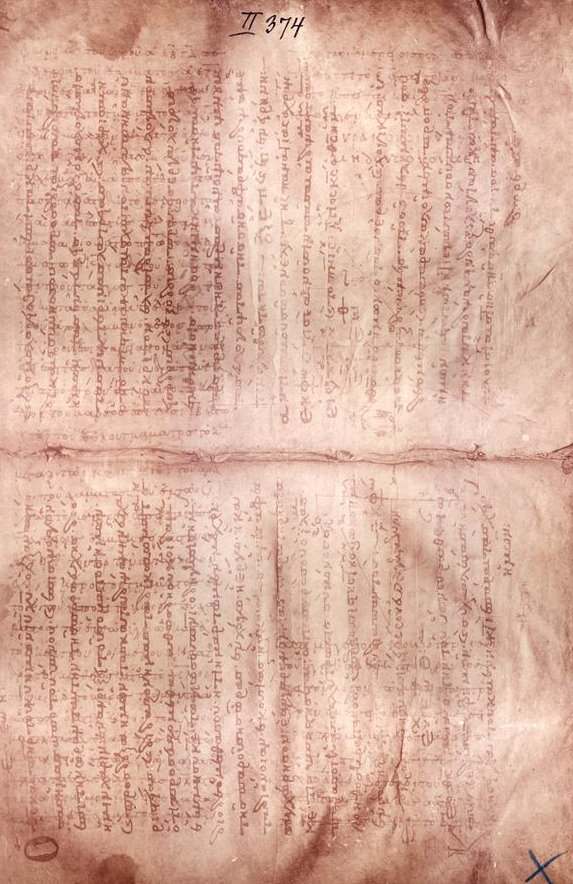
A typical page from the Archimedes Palimpsest. The text of the prayer book is seen from top to bottom, the original Archimedes manuscript is seen as fainter text below it running from left to right.

The Archimedes Palimpsest is a parchment codex palimpsest, originally a Byzantine Greek copy of a compilation of Archimedes and other authors. It contains two works of Archimedes that were thought to have been lost (the Ostomachion and the Method of Mechanical Theorems) and the only surviving original Greek edition of his work On Floating Bodies. The first version of the compilation is believed to have been produced by Isidore of Miletus, the architect of the geometrically complex Hagia Sophia cathedral in Constantinople, sometime around AD 530. The copy found in the palimpsest was created from this original, also in Constantinople, during the Macedonian Renaissance (c. AD 950), a time when mathematics in the capital was being revived by the former Greek Orthodox bishop of Thessaloniki Leo the Geometer, a cousin of the Patriarch.

Following the sack of Constantinople by Western crusaders in 1204, the manuscript was taken to an isolated Greek monastery in Palestine, possibly to protect it from occupying Crusaders, who often equated Greek script with heresy against their Latin church and either burned or looted many such texts (including two additional copies of Archimedes' writing, at least). The complex manuscript was not appreciated at this remote monastery and was soon scraped, washed and overwritten (1229) with a religious text (palimpsesting is the name of this process of cleaning and reusing old parchment). In 1899, nine hundred years after it was written, the manuscript was still in the possession of the Greek church, and back in Istanbul (the former Constantinople), where it was catalogued by the Greek scholar Papadopoulos-Kerameus, attracting the attention of Johan Heiberg. Heiberg visited the church library and was allowed to make detailed photographs in 1906. Most of the original text was still visible, and Heiberg published it in 1915. In 1922, the manuscript went missing in the midst of the evacuation of the Greek Orthodox library in Istanbul, during a tumultuous period following World War I. A Western businessman concealed the book for over 70 years, and at some point forged pictures were painted on top of some of the text to increase resale value. Unable to sell the book privately, in 1998, the businessman's daughter risked a public auction in New York contested by the Greek church; the U.S. court ruled for the auction, and the manuscript was purchased by an anonymous buyer (rumored to be Jeff Bezos). It was deposited by the buyer for conservation and study at the Walters Art Museum in Baltimore. The texts under the forged pictures, as well as previously unreadable texts, were revealed by analyzing images produced by ultraviolet, infrared, visible and raking light, and X-ray at Stanford University.

All images and transcriptions are now freely available on the web at the Archimedes Digital Palimpsest under the Creative Commons License CC BY.

== History ==
=== Early ===
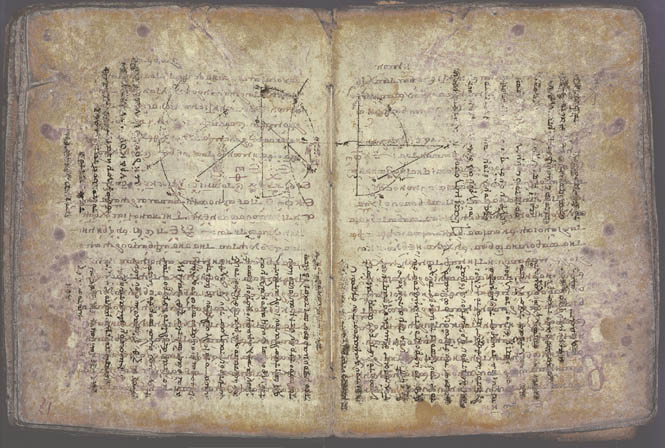
Photo of the palimpsest

Archimedes lived in the 3rd century BC and wrote his proofs as letters in Doric Greek addressed to contemporaries, including scholars at the Great Library of Alexandria. These letters were first compiled into a comprehensive text by Isidorus of Miletus, the architect of the Hagia Sophia patriarchal church, sometime around AD 530 in the then Byzantine Greek capital city of Constantinople.

A copy of Isidorus' edition of Archimedes was made around AD 950 by an anonymous scribe, again in the Byzantine Empire, in a period during which the study of Archimedes flourished in Constantinople, especially at the Magnaura, a school founded by the mathematician, engineer, and former Greek Orthodox archbishop of Thessaloniki, Leo the Geometer, a cousin of the Patriarch.

This medieval Byzantine manuscript then traveled from Constantinople to Jerusalem, likely sometime after the Crusader sack of Byzantine Constantinople in 1204. There, in 1229, the Archimedes codex was unbound, scraped and washed, along with at least six other partial parchment manuscripts, including one with works of Hypereides. Their leaves were folded in half, rebound and reused for a Christian liturgical text of 177 later numbered leaves, of which 174 are extant (each older folded leaf became two leaves of the liturgical book).

The manuscript includes a colophon which was deciphered in 2002 and found to contain the date April 13, 1229, which is likely when the prayerbook was finished. This was notably only a few months after the implementation of the Treaty of Jaffa, which returned Jerusalem to Christian control, bringing the Sixth Crusade to its end. The volatile political situation in the region may have resulted in a shortage of parchment, possibly providing one reason the scribe may have recycled the earlier manuscript.

The palimpsest remained near Jerusalem through at least the 16th century at the isolated Greek Orthodox monastery of Mar Saba. At some point before 1840 the palimpsest was brought back by the Greek Orthodox Patriarchate of Jerusalem to its library (the Metochion of the Holy Sepulcher) in Constantinople.

=== Modern ===
The Biblical scholar Constantin von Tischendorf visited Constantinople in the 1840s, and, intrigued by the Greek mathematics visible on the palimpsest he found in a Greek Orthodox library, removed a leaf of it (which is now in the Cambridge University Library). In 1899, the Greek scholar Papadopoulos-Kerameus produced a catalog of the library's manuscripts and included a transcription of several lines of the partially visible underlying text. Upon seeing these lines Johan Heiberg, the world's authority on Archimedes, realized that the work was by Archimedes. When Heiberg studied the palimpsest in Constantinople in 1906, he confirmed that the palimpsest included works by Archimedes thought to have been lost. Heiberg was permitted by the Greek Orthodox Church to take careful photographs of the palimpsest's pages, and from these he produced transcriptions, published between 1910 and 1915, in a complete works of Archimedes. Shortly thereafter Archimedes' Greek text was translated into English by Thomas Heath. Before that it was not widely known among mathematicians, physicists or historians.

The manuscript was still in the Greek Orthodox Patriarchate of Jerusalem's library (the Metochion of the Holy Sepulchre) in Constantinople in 1920. Shortly thereafter, during a turbulent period for the Greek community in Turkey that saw a Turkish victory in the Greco-Turkish War (1919–22) along with the Greek genocide and the forced population exchange between Greece and Turkey, the palimpsest disappeared from the Greek church's library in Istanbul.

Sometime between 1923 and 1930, the palimpsest was acquired by Marie Louis Sirieix, a "businessman and traveler to the Orient who lived in Paris." Though Sirieix claimed to have bought the manuscript from a monk, who would not in any case have had the authority to sell it, Sirieix had no receipt or documentation for a sale of the valuable manuscript. Stored secretly for years by Sirieix in his cellar, the palimpsest suffered damage from water and mold. In addition, after its disappearance from the Greek Orthodox Patriarchate's library, a forger added copies of medieval evangelical portraits in gold leaf onto four pages in the book in order to increase its sales value, further damaging the text. These forged gold leaf portraits nearly obliterated the text underneath them, and x-ray fluorescence imaging at the Stanford Linear Accelerator Center would later be required to reveal it.

Sirieix died in 1956, and, in 1970, his daughter began attempting quietly to sell the valuable manuscript. Unable to sell it privately, in 1998, she finally turned to Christie's to sell it in a public auction, risking an ownership dispute. The ownership of the palimpsest was immediately contested in federal court in New York, where the auction was to take place, in the case of the Greek Orthodox Patriarchate of Jerusalem v. Christie's, Inc. The Greek church contended that the palimpsest had been stolen from its library in Constantinople in the 1920s, during a period of extreme persecution. Judge Kimba Wood decided in favor of Christie's Auction House on laches grounds, and the palimpsest was bought for $2 million by an anonymous American buyer. The lawyer who represented the anonymous buyer stated that the buyer was "a private American" who worked in "the high-tech industry", but was not Bill Gates.

=== Imaging and digitization ===
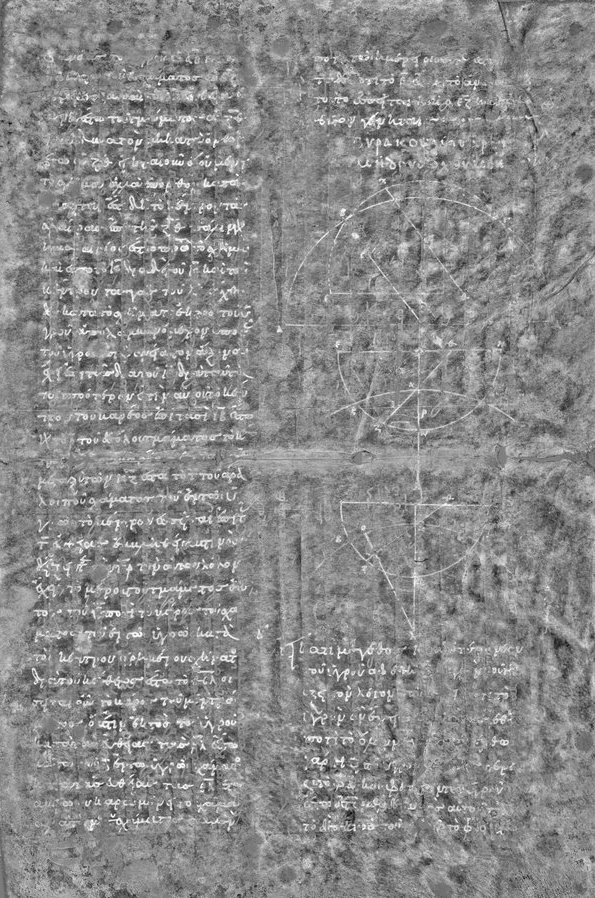
After imaging a page from the palimpsest, the original Archimedes text is now seen clearly.

The anonymous new owner loaned the book to the Walters Art Museum in Baltimore, where the palimpsest was the subject of an extensive imaging study from 1999 to 2008, and conservation (as it had suffered considerably from mold while in Sirieix's cellar). This was directed by Dr. William Noel, curator of manuscripts at the Walters Art Museum, and managed by Michael B. Toth of R.B. Toth Associates, with Dr. Abigail Quandt performing the conservation of the manuscript.

The target audiences for the digitisation are Greek scholars, math historians, people building applications, libraries, archives, and scientists interested in the production of the images.

A team of imaging scientists including Dr. Roger L. Easton Jr. from the Rochester Institute of Technology, Dr. William A. Christens-Barry from Equipoise Imaging, and Dr. Keith Knox (then with Boeing LTS, now retired from the USAF Research Laboratory) used computer processing of digital images from various spectral bands, including ultraviolet, visible, and infrared wavelengths to reveal most of the underlying text, including that of Archimedes. After imaging and digitally processing the entire palimpsest in three spectral bands prior to 2006, in 2007 they reimaged the entire palimpsest in 12 spectral bands, plus raking light: UV: 365 nanometers; Visible Light: 445, 470, 505, 530, 570, 617, and 625 nm; Infrared: 700, 735, and 870 nm; and Raking Light: 910 and 470 nm. The team digitally processed these images to reveal more of the underlying text with pseudocolor. They also digitized the original Heiberg images. Dr. Reviel Netz of Stanford University and Nigel Wilson have produced a diplomatic transcription of the text, filling in gaps in Heiberg's account with these images.

Sometime after 1938, a forger placed four Byzantine-style religious images in the manuscript in an effort to increase its sales value. It appeared that these had rendered the underlying text forever illegible. However, in May 2005, highly focused X-rays produced at the Stanford Linear Accelerator Center in Menlo Park, California, were used by Drs. Uwe Bergmann and Bob Morton to begin deciphering the parts of the 174-page text that had not yet been revealed. The production of X-ray fluorescence was described by Keith Hodgson, director of SSRL:

Synchrotron light is created when electrons traveling near the speed of light take a curved path around a storage ring—emitting electromagnetic light in X-ray through infrared wavelengths. The resulting light beam has characteristics that make it ideal for revealing the intricate architecture and utility of many kinds of matter—in this case, the previously hidden work of one of the founding fathers of all science.

In April 2007, it was announced that a new text had been found in the palimpsest, a commentary on Aristotle's Categories running to some 9,000 words. Most of this text was recovered in early 2009 by applying principal component analysis to the three color bands (red, green, and blue) of fluorescent light generated by ultraviolet illumination. Dr. Will Noel said in an interview:

You start thinking striking one palimpsest is gold, and striking two is utterly astonishing. But then something even more extraordinary happened.

This referred to the previous discovery of a text by Hypereides, an Athenian politician from the fourth century BC, which has also been found within the palimpsest. It is from his speech Against Diondas, and was published in 2008 in the academic journal Zeitschrift für Papyrologie und Epigraphik, vol. 165, becoming the first new text from the palimpsest to be published in a scholarly journal.

The transcriptions of the book were digitally encoded using the Text Encoding Initiative guidelines, and metadata for the images and transcriptions included identification and cataloging information based on Dublin Core Metadata Elements. The metadata and data were managed by Doug Emery of Emery IT.

On October 29, 2008 (the tenth anniversary of the purchase of the palimpsest at auction), all data, including images and transcriptions, were hosted on the Digital Palimpsest Web Page for free use under a Creative Commons License, and processed images of the palimpsest in original page order were posted as a Google Book. In 2011, it was the subject of the Walters Art Museum exhibit "Lost and Found: The Secrets of Archimedes". In 2015, in an experiment into the preservation of digital data, Swiss scientists encoded text from the Archimedes Palimpsest into DNA. Thanks to its deciphering, some mathematicians suggest it is possible that Archimedes may have invented integration.

On 6 March 2026, the Zeitschrift für Papyrologie und Epigraphik reported the discovery of a lost page of the manuscript, now held by the Musée des Beaux-Arts de Blois. The text corresponds to page 123 of the Palimpset's version of the On The Sphere and Cylinder, Book 1, Proposition 39-41. The reverse depicts a painting of Daniel surrounded by two lions.

== Contents ==
=== Works contained within ===
- On the Equilibrium of Planes
- On Spirals
- Measurement of a Circle
- On the Sphere and Cylinder
- On Floating Bodies
- The Method of Mechanical Theorems
- Ostomachion
- Speeches by the 4th-century BC politician Hypereides (Against Diondas and Against Timandros)
- A commentary on Aristotle's Categories by Porphyry (or by Alexander of Aphrodisias)
- Fragments of a tenth-century Menaion
- Fragments of a hagiographical text, Life of St. Pantoleon
- Two other unidentified fragments

=== The Method of Mechanical Theorems ===
The palimpsest contains the only known copy of The Method of Mechanical Theorems.

In his other works, Archimedes often proves the equality of two areas or volumes with Eudoxus' method of exhaustion, an ancient Greek counterpart of the modern method of limits. Since the Greeks were aware that some numbers were irrational, their notion of a real number was a quantity Q approximated by two sequences, one providing an upper bound and the other a lower bound. If one finds two sequences U and L, and U is always bigger than Q, and L always smaller than Q, and if the two sequences eventually came closer together than any prespecified amount, then Q is found, or exhausted, by U and L.

Archimedes used exhaustion to prove his theorems. This involved approximating the figure whose area he wanted to compute into sections of known area, which provide upper and lower bounds for the area of the figure. He then proved that the two bounds become equal when the subdivision becomes arbitrarily fine. These proofs, still considered to be rigorous and correct, used geometry with rare brilliance. Later writers often criticized Archimedes for not explaining how he arrived at his results in the first place. This explanation is contained in The Method.

The method that Archimedes describes was based upon his investigations of physics, on the center of mass and the law of the lever. He compared the area or volume of a figure of which he knew the total mass and center of mass with the area or volume of another figure he did not know anything about. He viewed plane figures as made out of infinitely many lines as in the later method of indivisibles, and balanced each line, or slice, of one figure against a corresponding slice of the second figure on a lever. The essential point is that the two figures are oriented differently so that the corresponding slices are at different distances from the fulcrum, and the condition that the slices balance is not the same as the condition that the figures are equal.

Once he shows that each slice of one figure balances each slice of the other figure, he concludes that the two figures balance each other. But the center of mass of one figure is known, and the total mass can be placed at this center and it still balances. The second figure has an unknown mass, but the position of its center of mass might be restricted to lie at a certain distance from the fulcrum by a geometrical argument, by symmetry. The condition that the two figures balance now allows him to calculate the total mass of the other figure. He considered this method as a useful heuristic but always made sure to prove the results he found using exhaustion, since the method did not provide upper and lower bounds.

Using this method, Archimedes was able to solve several problems now treated by integral calculus, which was given its modern form in the seventeenth century by Isaac Newton and Gottfried Leibniz. Among those problems were that of calculating the center of gravity of a solid hemisphere, the center of gravity of a frustum of a circular paraboloid, and the area of a region bounded by a parabola and one of its secant lines. For explicit details, see Archimedes' use of infinitesimals.

When rigorously proving theorems involving volume, Archimedes used a form of Cavalieri's principle, that two volume with equal-area cross-sections are equal; the same principle forms the basis of Riemann sums. In On the Sphere and Cylinder, he gives upper and lower bounds for the surface area of a sphere by cutting the sphere into sections of equal width. He then bounds the area of each section by the area of an inscribed and circumscribed cone, which he proves have a larger and smaller area correspondingly.

But there are two essential differences between Archimedes' method and 19th-century methods:

1. Archimedes did not know about differentiation, so he could not calculate any integrals other than those that came from center-of-mass considerations, by symmetry. While he had a notion of linearity, to find the volume of a sphere he had to balance two figures at the same time; he never determined how to change variables or integrate by parts.
2. When calculating approximating sums, he imposed the further constraint that the sums provide rigorous upper and lower bounds. This was required because the Greeks lacked algebraic methods that could establish that error terms in an approximation are small.

A problem solved exclusively in the Method is the calculation of the volume of a cylindrical wedge, a result that reappears as theorem XVII (schema XIX) of Kepler's Stereometria.

Some pages of the Method remained unused by the author of the palimpsest and thus they are still lost. Between them, an announced result concerned the volume of the intersection of two cylinders, a figure that Apostol and Mnatsakanian have renamed n = 4 Archimedean globe (and the half of it, n = 4 Archimedean dome), whose volume relates to the n-polygonal pyramid.

=== Stomachion ===
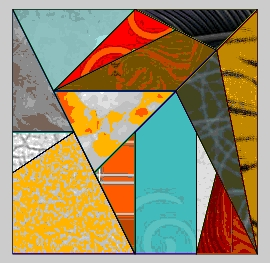
Ostomachion is a dissection puzzle in the Archimedes Palimpsest (shown after Suter from a different source; this version must be stretched to twice the width to conform to the Palimpsest).

In Heiberg's time, much attention was paid to Archimedes' brilliant use of indivisibles to solve problems about areas, volumes, and centers of gravity. Less attention was given to the Ostomachion, a problem treated in the palimpsest that appears to deal with a children's puzzle. Reviel Netz of Stanford University has argued that Archimedes discussed the number of ways to solve the puzzle, that is, to put the pieces back into their box. No pieces have been identified as such; the rules for placement, such as whether pieces are allowed to be turned over, are not known; and there is doubt about the board.

The board illustrated here, as also by Netz, is one proposed by Heinrich Suter in translating an unpointed Arabic text in which twice and equals are easily confused; Suter makes at least a typographical error at the crucial point, equating the lengths of a side and diagonal, in which case the board cannot be a rectangle. But, as the diagonals of a square intersect at right angles, the presence of right triangles makes the first proposition of Archimedes' Ostomachion immediate. Rather, the first proposition sets up a board consisting of two squares side by side (as in tangram). A reconciliation of the Suter board with this Codex board was published by Richard Dixon Oldham, FRS, in Nature in March, 1926, sparking an Ostomachion craze that year.

Modern combinatorics reveals that the number of ways to place the pieces of the Suter board to reform their square, allowing them to be turned over, is 17,152; the number is considerably smaller – 64 – if pieces are not allowed to be turned over. The sharpness of some angles in the Suter board makes fabrication difficult, while play could be awkward if pieces with sharp points are turned over. For the Codex board (again as with Tangram) there are three ways to pack the pieces: as two unit squares side by side; as two unit squares one on top of the other; and as a single square of side the square root of two. But the key to these packings is forming isosceles right triangles, just as Socrates gets the slave boy to consider in Plato's Meno – Socrates was arguing for knowledge by recollection, and here pattern recognition and memory seem more pertinent than a count of solutions. The Codex board can be found as an extension of Socrates' argument in a seven-by-seven-square grid, suggesting an iterative construction of the side-diameter numbers that give rational approximations to the square root of two.

The fragmentary state of the palimpsest leaves much in doubt. But it would certainly add to the mystery had Archimedes used the Suter board in preference to the Codex board. However, if Netz is right, this may have been the most sophisticated work in the field of combinatorics in Greek antiquity. Either Archimedes used the Suter board, the pieces of which were allowed to be turned over, or the statistics of the Suter board are irrelevant.

== See also ==
- List of most expensive books and manuscripts

== Additional sources ==
- Dijksterhuis, E. J. Dijksterhuis (1987). Archimedes. Princeton, NJ: Princeton University Press. pp. 129–133. ISBN 0-691-08421-1.
- Reviel Netz and William Noel. The Archimedes Codex, Weidenfeld & Nicolson, 2007
- The Nova Program outlined
- The Nova Program teacher's version
- The Method: English translation (Heiberg's 1909 transcription)
- Did Isaac Barrow read it?
- Will Noel: Restoring The Archimedes Palimpsest (YouTube), Ignite (O'Reilly), August 2009
- The Greek Orthodox Patriarchate of Jerusalem v. Christies's Inc., 1999 U.S. Dist. LEXIS 13257 (S.D. N.Y. 1999) (via Archive.org)
