= Archimedes =

Greek mathematician and physicist (c. 287 – 212 BC)

Archimedes of Syracuse
- Ἀρχιμήδης
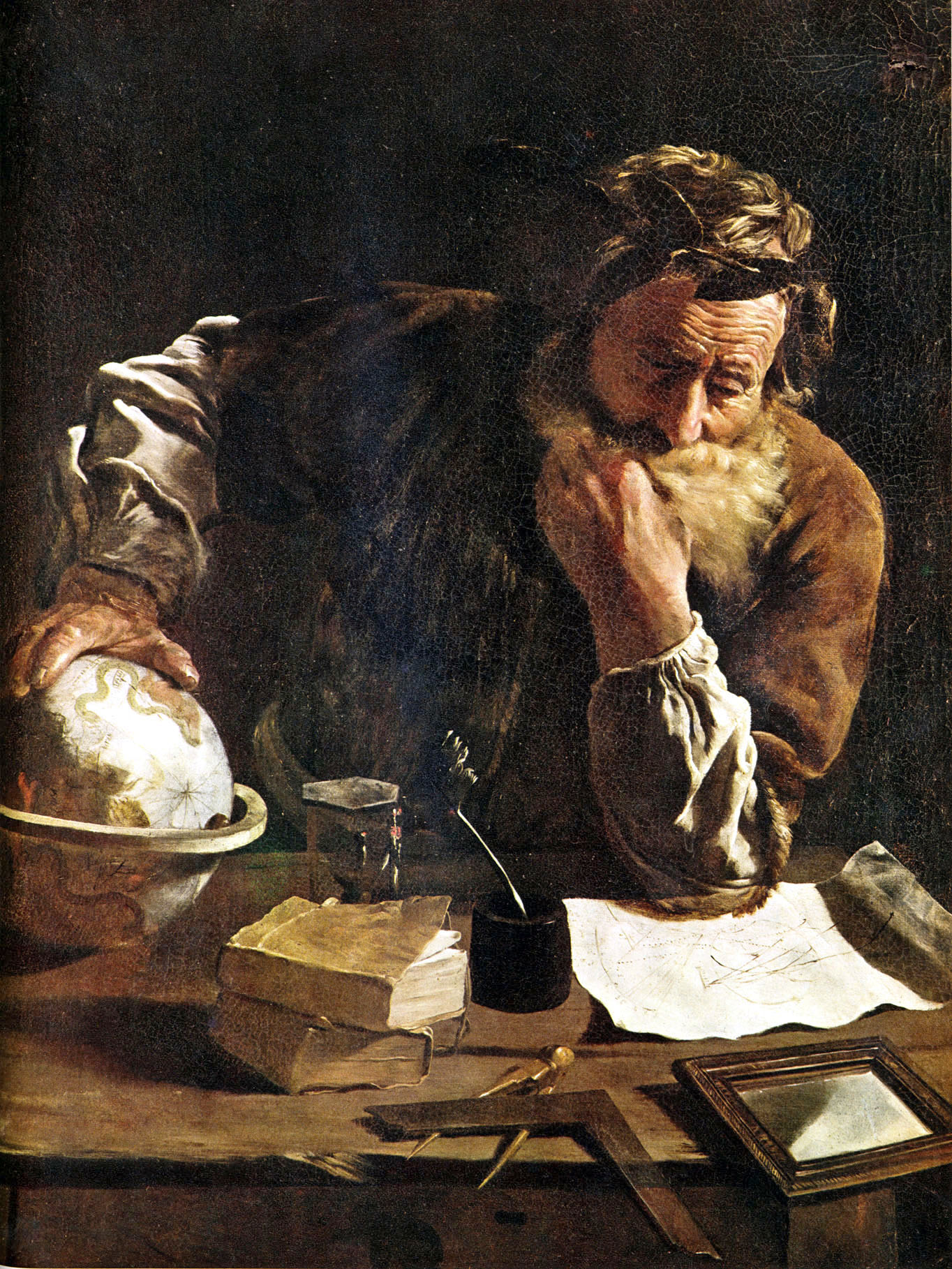
- Archimedes Thoughtful (1620)
- Born: c. 287 BC; Syracuse, Sicily
- Died: c. 212 BC (aged approximately 75); Syracuse, Sicily
- Known for: List: Archimedes' principle Archimedes' screw Center of gravity Statics Hydrostatics Law of the lever Indivisibles List of other namesakes
- Scientific career
- Fields: Mathematics; Physics; Astronomy; Mechanics; Engineering

Archimedes of Syracuse (Note: Doric Greek: Ἀρχιμήδης, pronounced [arkʰimɛːdɛ̂ːs].) (/ˌɑːrkɪˈmiːdiːz/ AR-kih-MEE-deez; c. 287 – c. 212 BC) was an Ancient Greek mathematician, physicist, engineer, astronomer, and inventor from the city of Syracuse in Sicily. Although few details of his life are known, based on his surviving work, he is considered one of the leading scientists in classical antiquity, and one of the greatest mathematicians of all time. Archimedes anticipated modern calculus and analysis by applying the concept of the infinitesimals and the method of exhaustion to derive and rigorously prove many geometrical theorems, including the area of a circle, the surface area and volume of a sphere, the area of an ellipse, the area under a parabola, the volume of a segment of a paraboloid of revolution, the volume of a segment of a hyperboloid of revolution, and the area of a spiral.

Archimedes' other mathematical achievements include deriving an approximation of pi (π), defining and investigating the Archimedean spiral, and devising a system using exponentiation for expressing very large numbers. He was also one of the first to apply mathematics to physical phenomena, working on statics and hydrostatics. Archimedes' achievements in this area include a proof of the law of the lever, the widespread use of the concept of center of gravity, and the enunciation of the law of buoyancy known as Archimedes' principle. In astronomy, he made measurements of the apparent diameter of the Sun and the size of the universe. He is also said to have built a planetarium device that demonstrated the movements of the known celestial bodies, and may have been a precursor to the Antikythera mechanism. He is also credited with designing innovative machines, such as his screw pump, compound pulleys, and defensive war machines to protect his native Syracuse from invasion.

Archimedes died during the siege of Syracuse, when he was killed by a Roman soldier despite orders that he should not be harmed. Cicero describes visiting Archimedes' tomb, which was surmounted by a sphere and a cylinder that Archimedes requested be placed there to represent his most valued mathematical discovery.

Unlike his inventions, Archimedes' mathematical writings were little known in antiquity. Alexandrian mathematicians read and quoted him, but the first comprehensive compilation was not made until c. 530 AD by Isidore of Miletus in Byzantine Constantinople, while Eutocius' commentaries on Archimedes' works in the same century opened them to wider readership for the first time. In the Middle Ages, Archimedes' work was translated into Arabic in the 9th century and then into Latin in the 12th century, and were an influential source of ideas for scientists during the Renaissance and in the Scientific Revolution. The discovery in 1906 of works by Archimedes in the Archimedes Palimpsest has provided new insights into how he obtained mathematical results.

== Biography ==
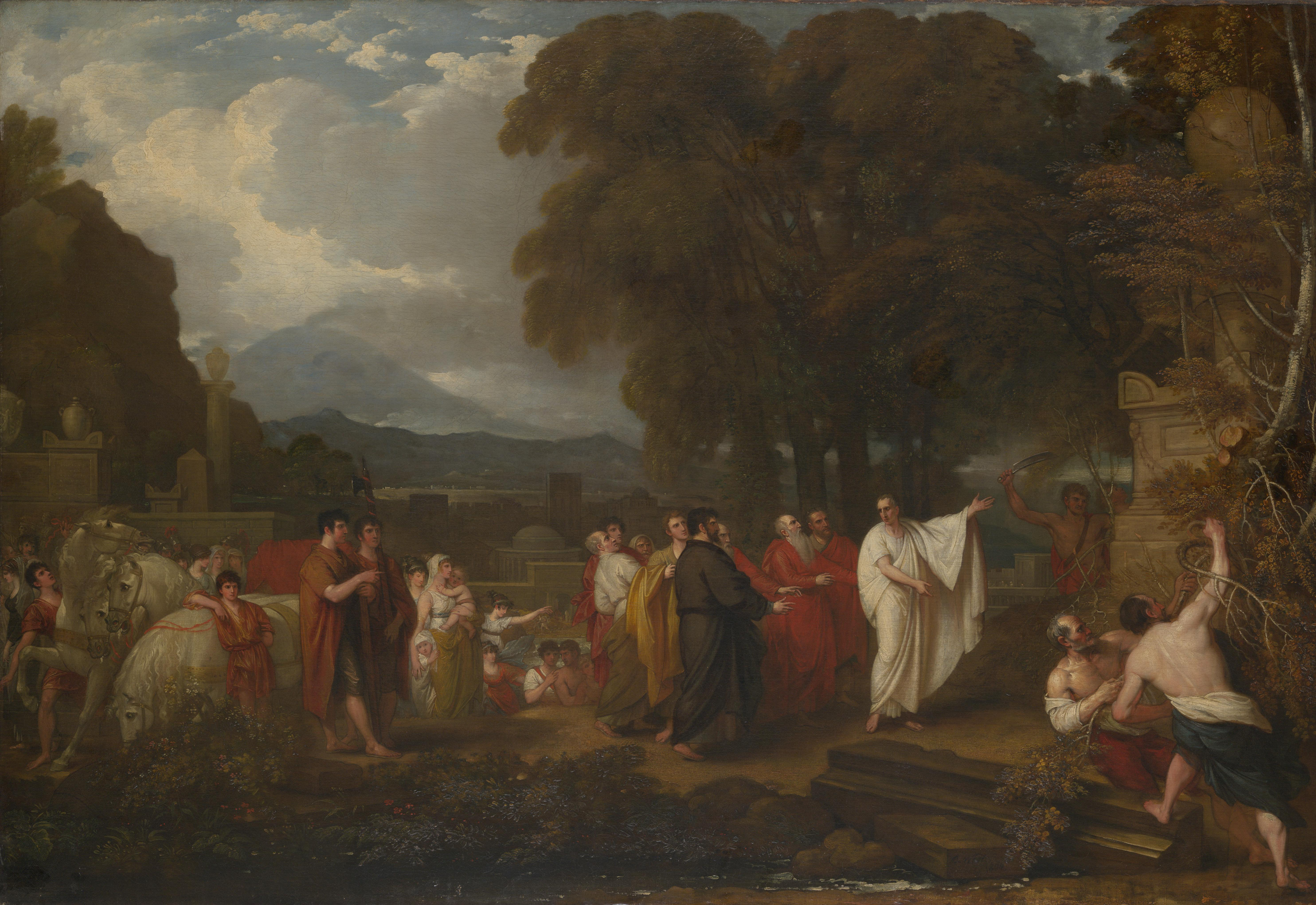
Cicero Discovering the Tomb of Archimedes (1805) by Benjamin West

The details of Archimedes's life are obscure; a biography of Archimedes mentioned by Eutocius was allegedly written by his friend Heraclides Lembus, but this work has been lost, and modern scholarship is doubtful that it was written by Heraclides to begin with.

Based on a statement by the Byzantine Greek scholar John Tzetzes that Archimedes lived for 75 years before his death in 212 BC, Archimedes is estimated to have been born c. 287 BC in the seaport city of Syracuse, Sicily, at that time a self-governing colony in Magna Graecia. In the Sand-Reckoner, Archimedes gives his father's name as Phidias, an astronomer about whom nothing else is known; Plutarch wrote in his Parallel Lives that Archimedes was related to King Hiero II, the ruler of Syracuse, although Cicero and Silius Italicus suggest he was of humble origin. It is also unknown whether he ever married or had children, or if he ever visited Alexandria, Egypt, during his youth; though his surviving written works, addressed to Dositheus of Pelusium, a student of the Alexandrian astronomer Conon of Samos, and to the head librarian Eratosthenes of Cyrene, suggested that he maintained collegial relations with scholars based there. In the preface to On Spirals addressed to Dositheus, Archimedes says that "many years have elapsed since Conon's death." Conon of Samos lived c. 280 – c. 220 BC, suggesting that Archimedes may have been an older man when writing some of his works.

=== Golden wreath ===
Measurement of volume (a) before and (b) after an object has been submerged, with (∆V) indicating the rising amount of liquid is equal to the volume of the object

Another story of a problem that Archimedes is credited solving with in service of Hiero II is the "wreath problem". According to Vitruvius, writing about two centuries after Archimedes' death, King Hiero II of Syracuse had commissioned a golden wreath for a temple to the immortal gods, and had supplied pure gold to be used by the goldsmith. However, the king had begun to suspect that the goldsmith had substituted some cheaper silver and kept some of the pure gold for himself, and, unable to make the smith confess, asked Archimedes to investigate. Later, while stepping into a bath, Archimedes allegedly noticed that the level of the water in the tub rose more the lower he sank in the tub and, realizing that this effect could be used to determine the golden crown's volume, was so excited that he took to the streets naked, having forgotten to dress, crying "Eureka!", (Note: Greek: "εὕρηκα, romanized: heúrēka) meaning "I have found [it]!" According to Vitruvius, Archimedes then took a lump of gold and a lump of silver that were each equal in weight to the wreath, and, placing each in the bathtub, showed that the wreath displaced more water than the gold and less than the silver, demonstrating that the wreath was gold mixed with silver.

A different account is given in the Carmen de Ponderibus, an anonymous 5th-century Latin didactic poem on weights and measures once attributed to the grammarian Priscian. In this poem, the lumps of gold and silver were placed on the scales of a balance, and then the entire apparatus was immersed in water; the difference in density between the gold and the silver, or between the gold and the crown, causes the scale to tip accordingly. Unlike the more famous bathtub account given by Vitruvius, this poetic account uses the hydrostatics principle now known as Archimedes' principle that is found in his treatise On Floating Bodies, where a body immersed in a fluid experiences a buoyant force equal to the weight of the fluid it displaces. Galileo Galilei, who invented a hydrostatic balance in 1586 inspired by Archimedes' work, considered it "probable that this method is the same that Archimedes followed, since, besides being very accurate, it is based on demonstrations found by Archimedes himself."

=== Launching the Syracusia ===
A large part of Archimedes' work in engineering probably arose from fulfilling the needs of his home city of Syracuse. Athenaeus of Naucratis in his Deipnosophistae quotes a certain Moschion for a description on how King Hiero II commissioned the design of a huge ship, the Syracusia, which is said to have been the largest ship built in classical antiquity and, according to Moschion's account, it was launched by Archimedes. Plutarch tells a slightly different account, relating that Archimedes boasted to Hiero that he was able to move any large weight, at which point Hiero challenged him to move a ship. These accounts contain many fantastic details that are historically implausible, and the authors of these stories provide conflicting ideas about how this task was accomplished: Plutarch states that Archimedes constructed a block-and-tackle pulley system, while Hero of Alexandria attributed the same boast to Archimedes' invention of the baroulkos, a kind of windlass. Pappus of Alexandria attributed this feat, instead, to Archimedes' use of mechanical advantage, the principle of leverage to lift objects that would otherwise have been too heavy to move, attributing to him the oft-quoted remark: "Give me a place to stand on, and I will move the Earth." (Note: Greek: δῶς μοι πᾶ στῶ καὶ τὰν γᾶν κινάσω)

Athenaeus, likely garbling the details of Hero's account of the baroulkos, also mentions that Archimedes used a "screw" in order to remove any potential water leaking through the hull of the Syracusia. Although this device is sometimes referred to as Archimedes' screw, it likely predates him by a significant amount, and none of his closest contemporaries who describe its use (Philo of Byzantium, Strabo, and Vitruvius) credit him with its use.

=== War machines ===
Mirrors placed as a parabolic reflector to attack upcoming ships

The greatest reputation Archimedes earned during antiquity was for the defense of his city from the Romans during the Siege of Syracuse. According to Plutarch, Archimedes had constructed war machines for Hiero II, but had never been given an opportunity to use them during Hiero's lifetime. In 214 BC, however, during the Second Punic War, when Syracuse switched allegiances from Rome to Carthage, the Roman army under Marcus Claudius Marcellus attempted to take the city, Archimedes allegedly personally oversaw the use of these war machines in the defense of the city, greatly delaying the Romans, who were able to capture the city only after a long siege. Three different historians, Plutarch, Livy, and Polybius provide testimony about these war machines, describing improved catapults, cranes that dropped heavy pieces of lead on the Roman ships or which used an iron claw to lift them out of the water, dropping them back in so that they sank. (Note: There have been modern experiments to test the feasibility of the claw, and in 2005 a television documentary entitled Superweapons of the Ancient World built a version of the claw and concluded that it was a workable device.)

A much more improbable account, not found in any of the three earliest accounts (Plutarch, Polybius, or Livy) describes how Archimedes used "burning mirrors" to focus the sun's rays onto the attacking Roman ships, setting them on fire. The earliest account to mention ships being set on fire, by the 2nd century CE satirist Lucian of Samosata, does not mention mirrors, and only says the ships were set on fire by artificial means, which may imply that burning projectiles were used. The first author to mention mirrors is Galen, writing later in the same century. Nearly four hundred years after Lucian and Galen, Anthemius, despite skepticism, tried to reconstruct Archimedes' hypothetical reflector geometry. The purported device, sometimes called "Archimedes' heat ray", has been the subject of an ongoing debate about its credibility since the Renaissance. René Descartes rejected it as false, while modern researchers have attempted to recreate the effect using only the means that would have been available to Archimedes, with mixed results.

=== Death ===
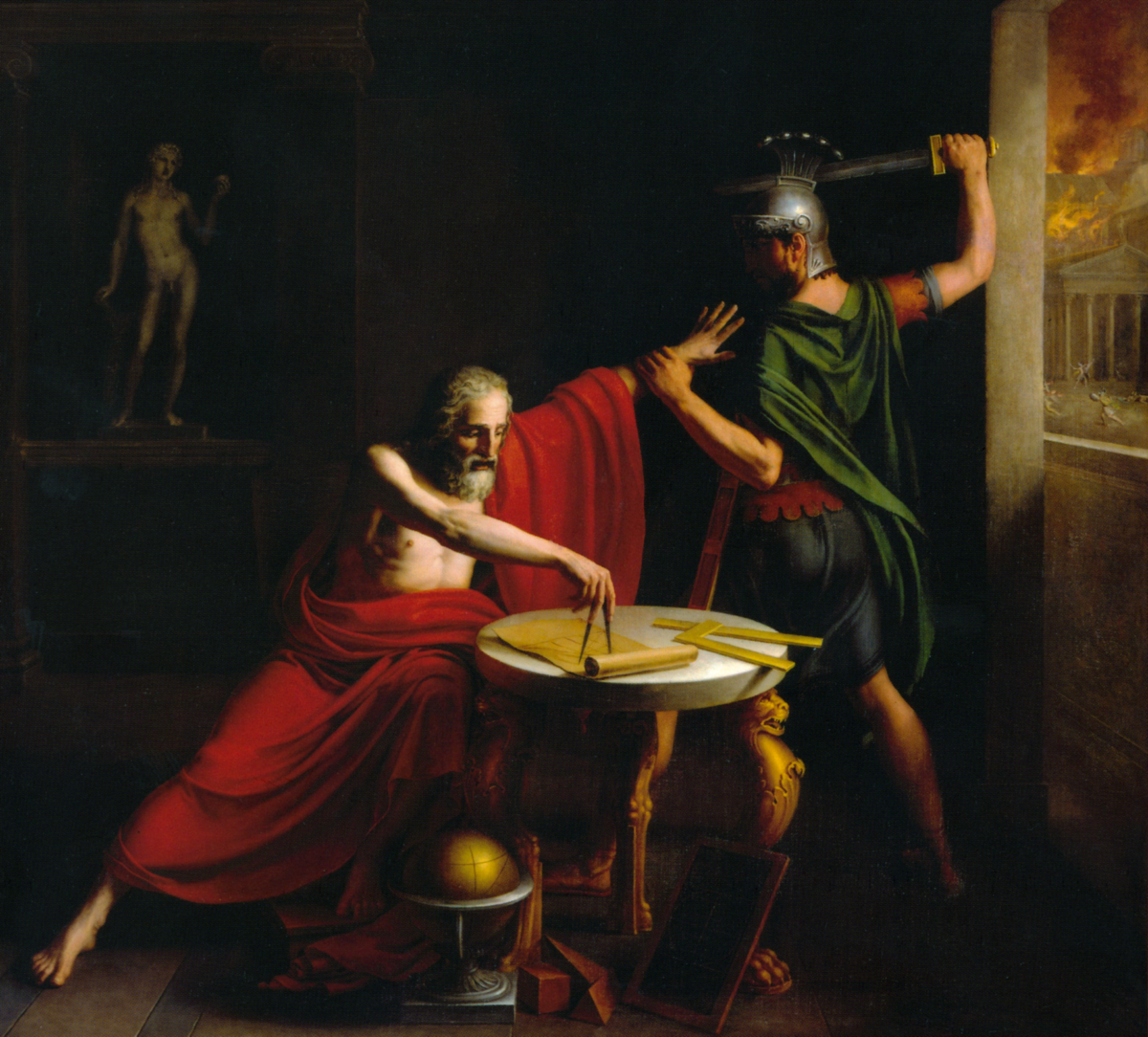
The Death of Archimedes (1815) by Thomas Degeorge

There are several divergent accounts of Archimedes' death during the sack of Syracuse after it fell to the Romans: The oldest account, from Livy, says that, while drawing figures in the dust, Archimedes was killed by a Roman soldier who did not know he was Archimedes. According to Plutarch, the soldier demanded that Archimedes come with him, but Archimedes declined, saying that he had to finish working on the problem, and the soldier killed Archimedes with his sword. Another story from Plutarch has Archimedes carrying mathematical instruments before being killed because a soldier thought they were valuable items. Another Roman writer, Valerius Maximus (fl. 30 AD), wrote in Memorable Doings and Sayings that Archimedes' last words as the soldier killed him were "... but protecting the dust with his hands, said 'I beg of you, do not disturb this.'" which is similar to the last words now commonly attributed to him, "Do not disturb my circles", which do not appear in any ancient sources.

Marcellus was reportedly angered by Archimedes' death, as he considered him a valuable scientific asset (he called Archimedes "a geometrical Briareus") and had ordered that he should not be harmed. Cicero (106–43 BC) mentions that Marcellus brought to Rome two planetariums Archimedes built, which were constructed by Archimedes and which showed the motion of the Sun, Moon and five planets, one of which he donated to the Temple of Virtue in Rome, and the other he allegedly kept as his only personal loot from Syracuse." Pappus of Alexandria reports on a now lost treatise by Archimedes On Sphere-Making, which may have dealt with the construction of these mechanisms. Constructing mechanisms of this kind would have required a sophisticated knowledge of differential gearing, which was once thought to have been beyond the range of the technology available in ancient times, but the discovery in 1902 of the Antikythera mechanism, another device built c. 100 BC designed with a similar purpose, has confirmed that devices of this kind were known to the ancient Greeks, with some scholars regarding Archimedes' device as a precursor.

While serving as a quaestor in Sicily, Cicero himself found what was presumed to be Archimedes' tomb near the Agrigentine gate in Syracuse, in a neglected condition and overgrown with bushes. Cicero had the tomb cleaned up and was able to see the carving and read some of the verses that had been added as an inscription. The tomb carried a sculpture illustrating Archimedes' favorite mathematical proof, that the volume and surface area of the sphere are two-thirds that of an enclosing cylinder including its bases.

== Mathematics ==
While he is often regarded as a designer of mechanical devices, Archimedes also made contributions to the field of mathematics, both in applying the techniques of his predecessors to obtain new results, and developing new methods of his own.

=== Method of exhaustion ===
Archimedes calculates the side of the dodecagon from that of the hexagon and for each subsequent doubling of the sides of the regular polygon

In Quadrature of the Parabola, Archimedes states that a certain proposition in Euclid's Elements demonstrating that the area of a circle is proportional to its diameter was proven using a lemma now known as the Archimedean property, that “the excess by which the greater of two unequal regions exceed the lesser, if added to itself, can exceed any given bounded region.” Prior to Archimedes, Eudoxus of Cnidus and other earlier mathematicians (Note: While Eudoxus is often credited for the whole of Euclid's Book XII, Archimedes explicitly credits him only with the proofs of XII.7 and XII.10, that the volume of a pyramid and a cone are, respectively, one-third of the volume of the rectangular prism and cone with the same base and height.Acerbi 2018, p. 279) applied this lemma, a technique now referred to as the "method of exhaustion," to find the volume of a tetrahedron, cylinder, cone, and sphere, for which proofs are given in book XII of Euclid's Elements.

In Measurement of a Circle, Archimedes employed this method to show that the area of a circle is the same as a right triangle whose base and height are equal to its radius and circumference. He then approximated the ratio between the radius and the circumference, the value of π, by drawing a larger regular hexagon outside a circle then a smaller regular hexagon inside the circle, and progressively doubling the number of sides of each regular polygon, calculating the length of a side of each polygon at each step. As the number of sides increases, it becomes a more accurate approximation of a circle. After four such steps, when the polygons had 96 sides each, he was able to determine that the value of π lay between 3 1/7 (approx. 3.1429) and 3 10/71 (approx. 3.1408), consistent with its actual value of approximately 3.1416. In the same treatise, he also asserts that the value of the square root of 3 as lying between 265/153 (approximately 1.7320261) and 1351/780 (approximately 1.7320512), which he may have derived from a similar method.

A proof that the area of the parabolic segment in the upper figure is equal to 4/3 that of the inscribed triangle in the lower figure from Quadrature of the Parabola

In Quadrature of the Parabola, Archimedes used this technique to prove that the area enclosed by a parabola and a straight line is 4/3 times the area of a corresponding inscribed triangle as shown in the figure at right, expressing the solution to the problem as an infinite geometric series with the common ratio 1/4:

$$\sum_{n=0}^\infty 4^{-n} = 1 + 4^{-1} + 4^{-2} + 4^{-3} + \cdots = {4\over 3}. \;$$

If the first term in this series is the area of the triangle, then the second is the sum of the areas of two triangles whose bases are the two smaller secant lines, and whose third vertex is where the line that is parallel to the parabola's axis and that passes through the midpoint of the base intersects the parabola, and so on. This proof uses a variation of the series 1/4 + 1/16 + 1/64 + 1/256 + · · · which sums to 1/3.

He also used this technique in order to measure the surface areas of a sphere and cone, to calculate the area of an ellipse, and to find the area contained within an Archimedean spiral.

=== Mechanical method ===
For it is more feasible, having already in one’s possession, through the method, of a knowledge of some sort of the matters under investigation, to provide the proof – rather than investigating it, knowing nothing.

— Archimedes, The Method of Mechanical Theorems

In addition to developing on the works of earlier mathematicians with the method of exhaustion, Archimedes also pioneered a novel technique using the law of the lever in order to measure the area and volume of shapes using physical means. He first gives an outline of this proof in Quadrature of the Parabola alongside the geometric proof, but he gives a fuller explanation in The Method of Mechanical Theorems. According to Archimedes, he proved the results in his mathematical treatises first using this method, and then worked backwards, applying the method of exhaustion only after he had already calculated an approximate value for the answer.

=== Large numbers ===
Archimedes also developed methods for representing large numbers.

In The Sand Reckoner, Archimedes devised a system of counting based on the myriad, (Note: μυριάς, murias) the Greek term for the number 10,000, in order to calculate a number that was greater than the grains of sand needed to fill the universe. He proposed a number system using powers of a myriad of myriads (100 million, i.e., 10,000 x 10,000) and concluded that the number of grains of sand required to fill the universe would be 8 vigintillion, or 8×10^{63}. In doing so, he demonstrated that mathematics could represent arbitrarily large numbers.

In the Cattle Problem, Archimedes challenges the mathematicians at the Library of Alexandria to count the numbers of cattle in the Herd of the Sun, which involves solving a number of simultaneous Diophantine equations. A more difficult version of the problem in which some of the answers are required to be square numbers, and the answer is a very large number, approximately 7.760271×10^{206544}.

=== Archimedean solid ===
In a lost work described by Pappus of Alexandria, Archimedes proved that there are exactly thirteen semiregular polyhedra.

== Writings ==
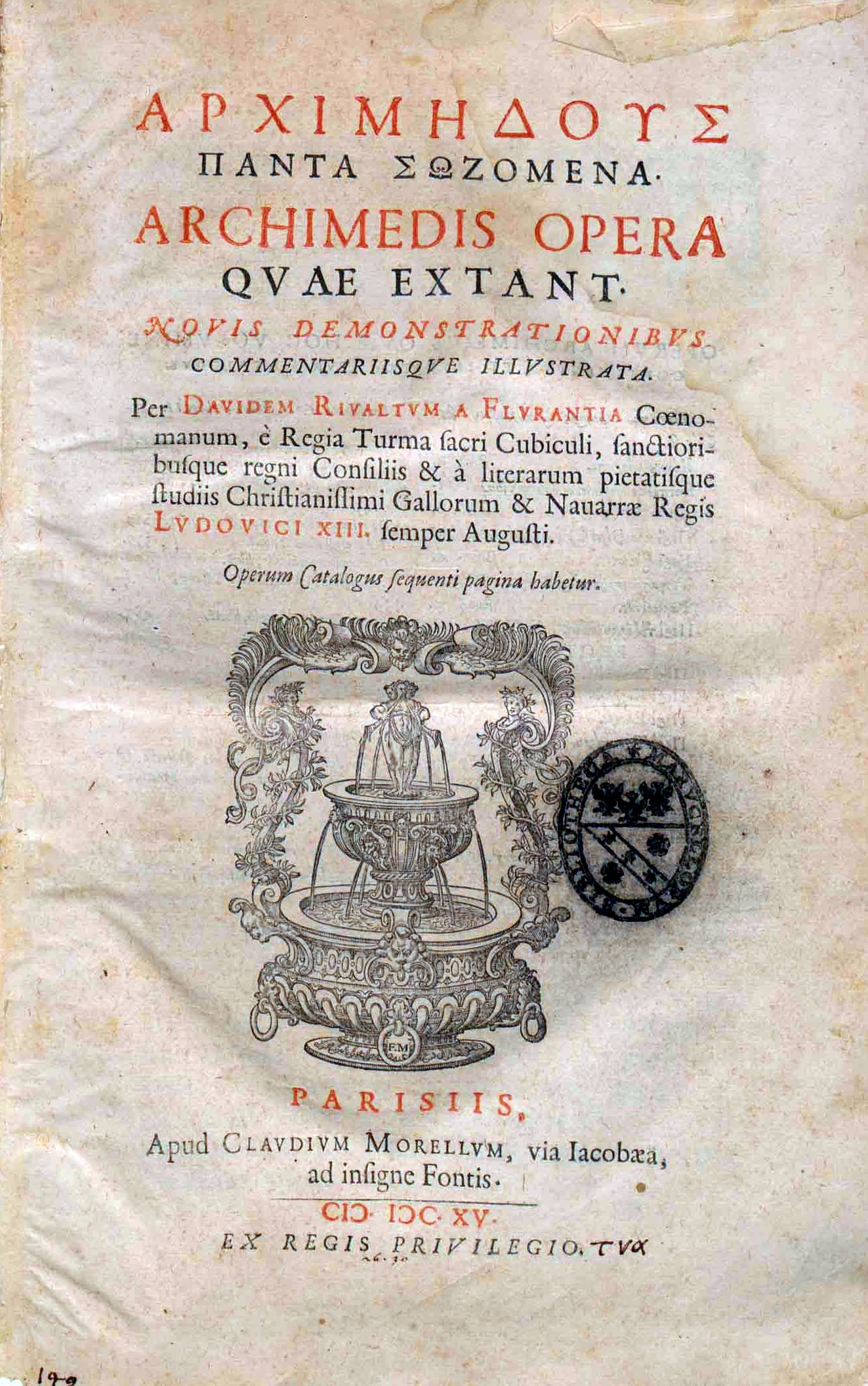
Front page of Archimedes' Opera, in Greek and Latin, edited by David Rivault (1615)

Archimedes made his work known through correspondence with mathematicians in Alexandria, which were originally written in Doric Greek, the dialect of ancient Syracuse.

=== Surviving works ===
The following are ordered chronologically based on new terminological and historical criteria set by Knorr (1978) and Sato (1986).

==== Measurement of a Circle ====
This is a short work consisting of three propositions. It is written in the form of a correspondence with Dositheus of Pelusium, who was a student of Conon of Samos. In Proposition II, Archimedes gives an approximation of the value of pi (π), showing that it is greater than 223/71 (3.1408...) and less than 22/7 (3.1428...).

==== The Sand Reckoner ====
In this treatise, also known as Psammites, Archimedes finds a number that is greater than the grains of sand needed to fill the universe. This book mentions the heliocentric theory of the Solar System proposed by Aristarchus of Samos, as well as contemporary ideas about the size of the Earth and the distance between various celestial bodies, and attempts to measure the apparent diameter of the Sun. By using a system of numbers based on powers of the myriad, Archimedes concludes that the number of grains of sand required to fill the universe is 8×10^{63} in modern notation. The introductory letter states that Archimedes' father was an astronomer named Phidias. The Sand Reckoner is the only surviving work in which Archimedes discusses his views on astronomy.

Archimedes discusses astronomical measurements of the Earth, Sun, and Moon, as well as Aristarchus' heliocentric model of the universe, in the Sand-Reckoner. Without the use of either trigonometry or a table of chords, Archimedes determines the Sun's apparent diameter by first describing the procedure and instrument used to make observations (a straight rod with pegs or grooves), applying correction factors to these measurements, and finally giving the result in the form of upper and lower bounds to account for observational error.

Ptolemy, quoting Hipparchus, also references Archimedes' solstice observations in the Almagest. This would make Archimedes the first known Greek to have recorded multiple solstice dates and times in successive years.

==== On the Equilibrium of Planes ====
There are two books to On the Equilibrium of Planes: the first contains seven postulates and fifteen propositions, while the second book contains ten propositions. In the first book, Archimedes proves the law of the lever, which states that:

Magnitudes are in equilibrium at distances reciprocally proportional to their weights.

Earlier descriptions of the principle of the lever are found in a work by Euclid and in the Mechanical Problems, belonging to the Peripatetic school of the followers of Aristotle, the authorship of which has been attributed by some to Archytas.

Archimedes uses the principles derived to calculate the areas and centers of gravity of various geometric figures including triangles, parallelograms and parabolas.

==== Quadrature of the Parabola ====
In this work of 24 propositions addressed to Dositheus, Archimedes proves by two methods that the area enclosed by a parabola and a straight line is 4/3 the area of a triangle with equal base and height. He achieves this by two different methods: first by applying the law of the lever, and by calculating the value of a geometric series that sums to infinity with the ratio 1/4.

==== On the Sphere and Cylinder ====
A sphere has 2/3 the volume and surface area of its circumscribing cylinder including its bases

In this two-volume treatise addressed to Dositheus, Archimedes obtains the result of which he was most proud, namely the relationship between a sphere and a circumscribed cylinder of the same height and diameter. The volume is 4/3πr^{3} for the sphere, and 2πr^{3} for the cylinder. The surface area is 4πr^{2} for the sphere, and 6πr^{2} for the cylinder (including its two bases), where r is the radius of the sphere and cylinder.

==== On Spirals ====
This work of 28 propositions is also addressed to Dositheus. The treatise defines what is now called the Archimedean spiral. It is the locus of points corresponding to the locations over time of a point moving away from a fixed point with a constant speed along a line which rotates with constant angular velocity. Equivalently, in modern polar coordinates (r, θ), it can be described by the equation $\, r=a+b\theta$ with real numbers a and b.

This is an early example of a mechanical curve (a curve traced by a moving point) considered by a Greek mathematician.

==== On Conoids and Spheroids ====
This is a work in 32 propositions addressed to Dositheus. In this treatise Archimedes calculates the areas and volumes of sections of cones, spheres, and paraboloids.

==== On Floating Bodies ====
There are two books of On Floating Bodies. In the first book, Archimedes spells out the law of equilibrium of fluids and proves that water will adopt a spherical form around a center of gravity.

Archimedes' principle of buoyancy is given in this work, stated as follows:

Any body wholly or partially immersed in fluid experiences an upthrust equal to, but opposite in direction to, the weight of the fluid displaced.

In the second part, he calculates the equilibrium positions of sections of paraboloids. This was probably an idealization of the shapes of ships' hulls. Some of his sections float with the base under water and the summit above water, similar to the way that icebergs float.

==== Ostomachion ====
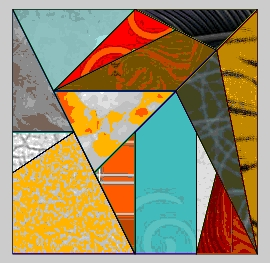
Ostomachion is a dissection puzzle found in the Archimedes Palimpsest

Also known as Loculus of Archimedes or Archimedes' Box, this is a dissection puzzle similar to a Tangram, and the treatise describing it was found in more complete form in the Archimedes Palimpsest. Archimedes calculates the areas of the 14 pieces, which can be assembled to form a square. Reviel Netz of Stanford University argued in 2003 that Archimedes was attempting to determine how many ways the pieces could be assembled into the shape of a square. Netz calculates that the pieces can be made into a square 17,152 ways. The number of arrangements is 536 when solutions that are equivalent by rotation and reflection are excluded. The puzzle represents an example of an early problem in combinatorics.

The origin of the puzzle's name is unclear, and it has been suggested that it is taken from the Ancient Greek word for "throat" or "gullet", stomachos (στόμαχος). Ausonius calls the puzzle Ostomachion, a Greek compound word formed from the roots of osteon (ὀστέον, 'bone') and machē (μάχη, 'fight').

==== Cattle problem ====
In this work, addressed to Eratosthenes and the mathematicians in Alexandria, Archimedes challenges them to count the numbers of cattle in the Herd of the Sun, which involves solving a number of simultaneous Diophantine equations. Gotthold Ephraim Lessing discovered this work in a Greek manuscript consisting of a 44-line poem in the Herzog August Library in Wolfenbüttel, Germany, in 1773. There is a more difficult version of the problem in which some of the answers are required to be square numbers. A. Amthor first solved this version of the problem in 1880, and the answer is a very large number, approximately 7.760271×10^{206544}.

==== The Method of Mechanical Theorems ====
As with The Cattle Problem, The Method of Mechanical Theorems was written in the form of a letter to Eratosthenes in Alexandria.

In this work Archimedes uses a novel method, an early form of Cavalieri's principle, to rederive the results from the treatises sent to Dositheus (Quadrature of the Parabola, On the Sphere and Cylinder, On Spirals, On Conoids and Spheroids) that he had previously used the method of exhaustion to prove, using the law of the lever he applied in On the Equilbrium of Planes in order to find the center of gravity of an object first, and reasoning geometrically from there in order to more easily derive the volume of an object. Archimedes states that he used this method to derive the results in the treatises sent to Dositheus before he proved them more rigorously with the method of exhaustion, stating that it is useful to know that a result is true before proving it rigorously, much as Eudoxus of Cnidus was aided in proving that the volume of a cone is one-third the volume of cylinder by knowing that Democritus had already asserted it to be true on the argument that this is true by the fact that the pyramid has one-third the rectangular prism of the same base.

This treatise was thought lost until the discovery of the Archimedes Palimpsest in 1906.

=== Apocryphal works ===
Archimedes' Book of Lemmas or Liber Assumptorum is a treatise with 15 propositions on the nature of circles. The earliest known copy of the text is in Arabic. T. L. Heath argued that it cannot have been written by Archimedes in its current form, since it quotes Archimedes by name, suggesting the lemmas were compiled by a later author. He thought its ideas, like the Arbelos, were Archimedean in origin. Tannery supposes that if such a work once existed, it had already been lost by the time of Pappus, who put similar lemmas in the Collection, calling them, "ancient and from various works".

Other questionable attributions to Archimedes' work include the Latin poem Carmen de ponderibus et mensuris (4th or 5th century), which describes the use of a hydrostatic balance, to solve the problem of the crown, and the 12th-century text Mappae clavicula, which contains instructions on how to perform assaying of metals by calculating their specific gravities.

=== Lost works ===
Many written works by Archimedes have not survived or are only extant in heavily edited fragments: Pappus of Alexandria mentions On Sphere-Making, as well as a work on semiregular polyhedra, and another work on spirals, while Theon of Alexandria quotes a remark about refraction from the now-lost Catoptrica. Principles, addressed to Zeuxippus, explained the number system used in The Sand Reckoner; there are also On Balances; On Centers of Gravity.

Scholars in the medieval Islamic world also attribute to Archimedes a formula for calculating the area of a triangle from the length of its sides, which today is known as Heron's formula due to its first known appearance in the work of Heron of Alexandria in the 1st century AD, and may have been proven in a lost work of Archimedes that is no longer extant.

=== Archimedes Palimpsest ===
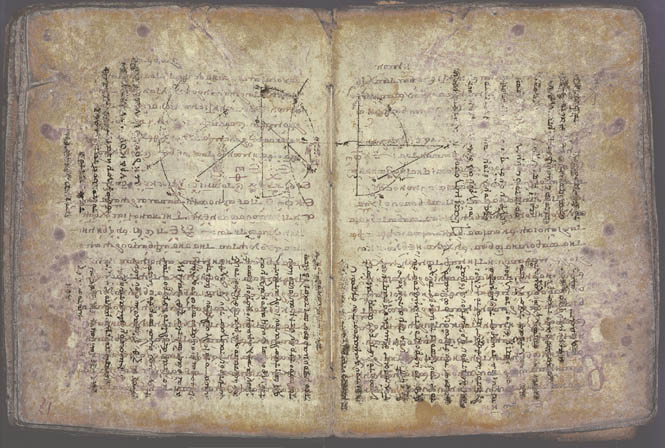
In 1906, the Archimedes Palimpsest revealed works by Archimedes thought to have been lost

In 1906, the Danish professor Johan Ludvig Heiberg visited Constantinople to examine a 174-page goatskin parchment of prayers, written in the 13th century, after reading a short transcription published seven years earlier (in 1899) by Papadopoulos-Kerameus. He confirmed that it was indeed a palimpsest, a document with text that had been written over an erased older work. Palimpsests were created by scraping the ink from existing works and reusing them, a common practice in the Middle Ages, as vellum was expensive. The older works in the palimpsest were identified by scholars as 10th-century copies of previously lost treatises by Archimedes. The palimpsest holds seven treatises, including the only surviving copy of On Floating Bodies in the original Greek. It is the only known source of The Method of Mechanical Theorems, referred to by Suidas and thought to have been lost forever. Stomachion was also discovered in the palimpsest, with a more complete analysis of the puzzle than had been found in previous texts.

The treatises in the Archimedes Palimpsest include:

- On the Equilibrium of Planes
- On Spirals
- Measurement of a Circle
- On the Sphere and Cylinder
- On Floating Bodies
- The Method of Mechanical Theorems
- Stomachion
- Speeches by the 4th century BC politician Hypereides
- A commentary on Aristotle's Categories
- Other works

The parchment spent hundreds of years in a monastery library in Constantinople before being sold to a private collector in the 1920s. On 29 October 1998, it was sold at auction to an anonymous buyer for a total of $2.2 million. The palimpsest was stored at the Walters Art Museum in Baltimore, Maryland, where it was subjected to a range of modern tests including the use of ultraviolet and X-ray light to read the overwritten text. It has since returned to its anonymous owner.

== Legacy ==
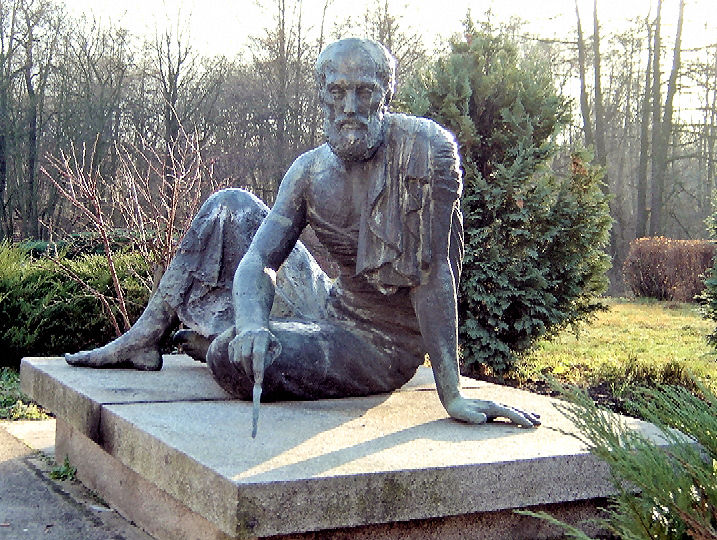
Bronze statue of Archimedes in Berlin

Sometimes called the father of mathematics and mathematical physics, historians of science and mathematics almost universally agree that Archimedes was the finest mathematician from antiquity.

=== Classical antiquity ===
The reputation that Archimedes had for mechanical inventions in classical antiquity is well-documented; Athenaeus recounts in his Deipnosophistae how Archimedes launched the largest known ship in antiquity, the Syracusia, while Apuleius talks about his work in catoptrics. Plutarch had claimed that Archimedes disdained mechanics and focused primarily on pure geometry, but this is generally considered to be a mischaracterization by modern scholarship, fabricated to bolster Plutarch's own Platonist values rather than to an accurate presentation of Archimedes.

=== Middle ages ===
Archimedes' work was translated into Arabic by Thābit ibn Qurra, and into Latin via Arabic by Gerard of Cremona. Direct Greek to Latin translations were later done by William of Moerbeke and Iacobus Cremonensis.

=== Renaissance and early modern Europe ===
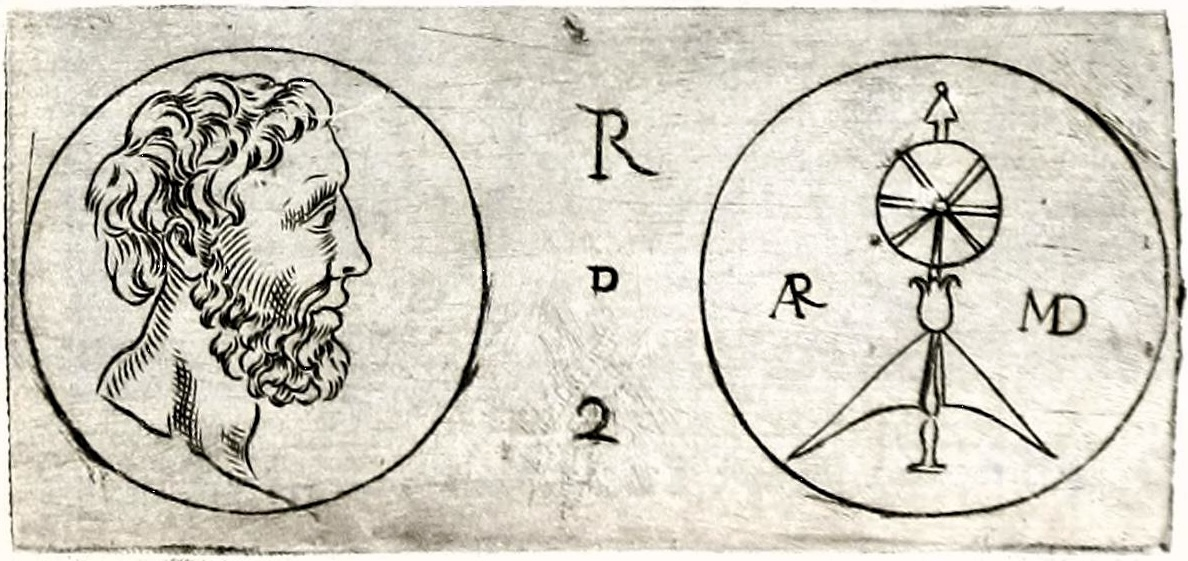
1612 drawing of a now-lost bronze coin depicting Archimedes

During the Renaissance, the Editio princeps (First Edition) was published in Basel in 1544 by Johann Herwagen with the works of Archimedes in Greek and Latin, which were an influential source of ideas for scientists during the Renaissance and again in the 17th century.

Leonardo da Vinci repeatedly expressed admiration for Archimedes, and attributed his invention Architonnerre to Archimedes. Galileo Galilei called him "superhuman" and "my master", while Christiaan Huygens said, "I think Archimedes is comparable to no one", consciously emulating him in his early work. Gottfried Wilhelm Leibniz said, "He who understands Archimedes and Apollonius will admire less the achievements of the foremost men of later times".

Italian numismatist and archaeologist Filippo Paruta and Leonardo Agostini reported on a bronze coin in Sicily with the portrait of Archimedes on the obverse and a cylinder and sphere with the monogram ARMD in Latin on the reverse. Although the coin is now lost and its date is not precisely known, Ivo Schneider described the reverse as "a sphere resting on a base – probably a rough image of one of the planetaria created by Archimedes," and suggested it might have been minted in Rome for Marcellus who "according to ancient reports, brought two spheres of Archimedes with him to Rome".

=== In modern mathematics ===
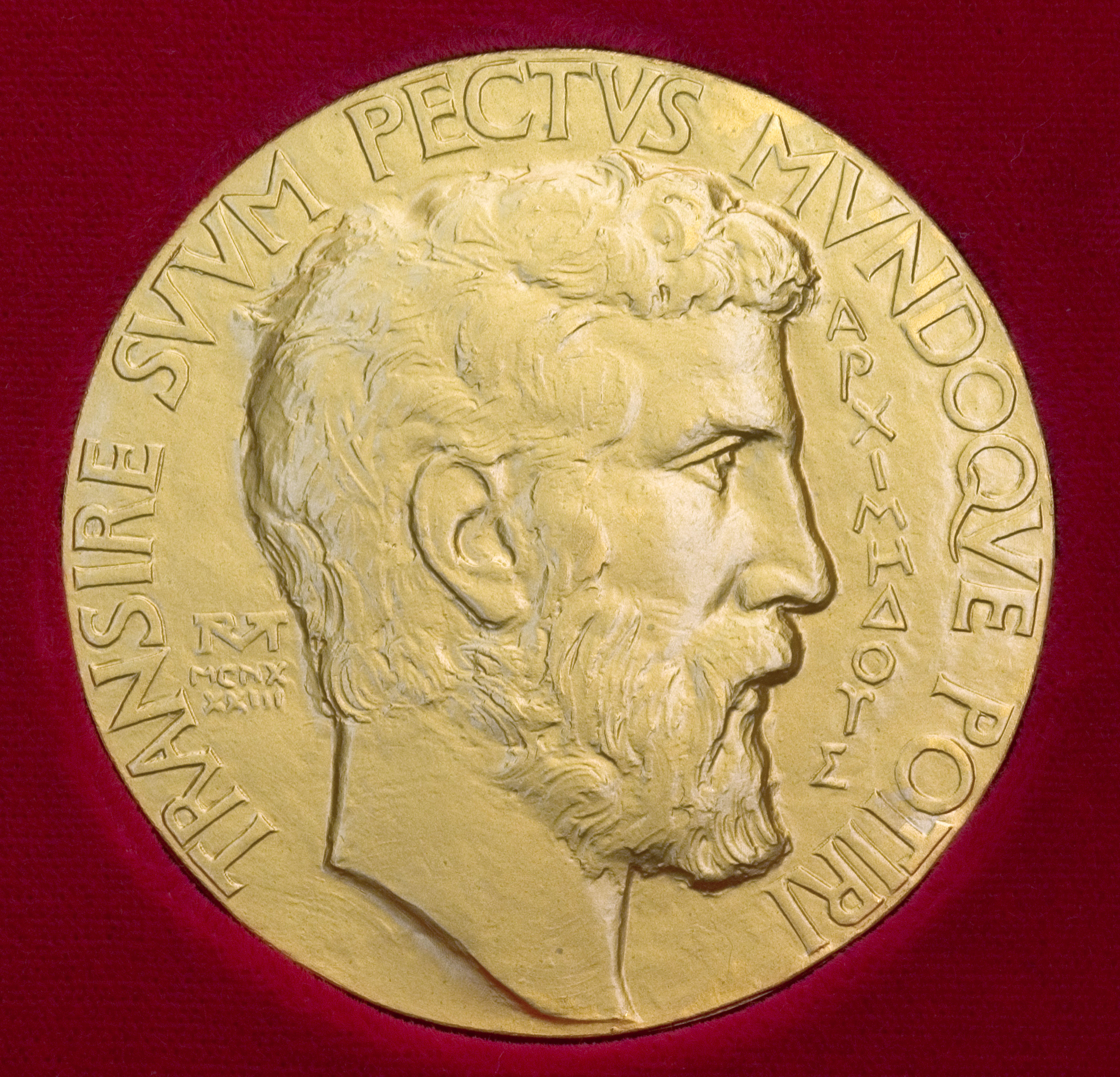
The Fields Medal carries a portrait of Archimedes.

Carl Friedrich Gauss's heroes were Archimedes and Newton, and Moritz Cantor, who studied under Gauss in the University of Göttingen, reported that he once remarked in conversation that "there had been only three epoch-making mathematicians: Archimedes, Newton, and Eisenstein". Likewise, Alfred North Whitehead said that "in the year 1500 Europe knew less than Archimedes who died in the year 212 BC." The historian of mathematics Reviel Netz, echoing Whitehead's proclamation on Plato and philosophy, said that "Western science is but a series of footnotes to Archimedes," calling him "the most important scientist who ever lived." and Eric Temple Bell, wrote that "Any list of the three 'greatest' mathematicians of all history would include the name of Archimedes. The other two usually associated with him are Newton and Gauss. Some, considering the relative wealth—or poverty—of mathematics and physical science in the respective ages in which these giants lived, and estimating their achievements against the background of their times, would put Archimedes first."

The discovery in 1906 of previously lost works by Archimedes in the Archimedes Palimpsest has provided new insights into how he obtained mathematical results.

The Fields Medal for outstanding achievement in mathematics carries a portrait of Archimedes, along with a carving illustrating his proof on the sphere and the cylinder. The inscription around the head of Archimedes is a quote attributed to 1st century AD poet Manilius, which reads in Latin: Transire suum pectus mundoque potiri ("Rise above oneself and grasp the world").

=== Cultural influence ===
The world's first seagoing steamship with a screw propeller was the SS Archimedes, which was launched in 1839 and named in honor of Archimedes and his work on the screw.

Archimedes has also appeared on postage stamps issued by East Germany (1973), Greece (1983), Italy (1983), Nicaragua (1971), San Marino (1982), and Spain (1963).

The exclamation of Eureka! attributed to Archimedes is the state motto of California. In this instance, the word refers to the discovery of gold near Sutter's Mill in 1848 which sparked the California gold rush.

There is a crater on the Moon named Archimedes (29.7°N 4.0°W) in his honor, as well as a lunar mountain range, the Montes Archimedes (25.3°N 4.6°W).

== See also ==
- List of things named after Archimedes
- Arbelos
- Archimedean point
- Archimedes number
- Archimedes paradox
- Methods of computing square roots
- Salinon
- Steam cannon
- Twin circles
- Zhang Heng
