= On Spirals =

Ancient Greek mathematics book

On Spirals (Greek: Περὶ ἑλίκων) is a treatise by Archimedes, written around 225 BC. Notably, Archimedes employed the Archimedean spiral in this book to square the circle and trisect an angle.

== Contents ==
=== Preface ===
Archimedes begins On Spirals with a message to Dositheus of Pelusium mentioning the death of Conon as a loss to mathematics. He then goes on to summarize the results of On the Sphere and Cylinder (Περὶ σφαίρας καὶ κυλίνδρου) and On Conoids and Spheroids (Περὶ κωνοειδέων καὶ σφαιροειδέων). He continues to state his results of On Spirals.

=== Archimedean spiral ===
The Archimedean spiral with three 360° turnings on one arm

The Archimedean spiral was first studied by Conon and was later studied by Archimedes in On Spirals. Archimedes was able to find various tangents to the spiral. He defines the spiral as:

If a straight line one extremity of which remains fixed is made to revolve at a uniform rate in a plane until it returns to the position from which it started, and if, at the same time as the straight line is revolving, a point moves at a uniform rate along the straight line, starting from the fixed extremity, the point will describe a spiral in the plane.

=== Trisecting an angle ===
Example of how Archimedes trisected an angle in On Spirals.

The construction as to how Archimedes trisected the angle is as follows:

Suppose the angle ABC is to be trisected. Trisect the segment BC and find BD to be one third of BC. Draw a circle with center B and radius BD. Suppose the circle with center B intersects the spiral at point E. Angle ABE is one third angle ABC.

=== Squaring the circle ===
The circle and the triangle are equal in area.

To square the circle, Archimedes gave the following construction:

Let P be the point on the spiral when it has completed one turn. Let the tangent at P cut the line perpendicular to OP at T. OT is the length of the circumference of the circle with radius OP.

Archimedes had already proved as the first proposition of Measurement of a Circle that the area of a circle is equal to a right-angled triangle having the legs' lengths equal to the radius of the circle and the circumference of the circle. So the area of the circle with radius OP is equal to the area of the triangle OPT.
