= Raking light =

Facet of art and illumination

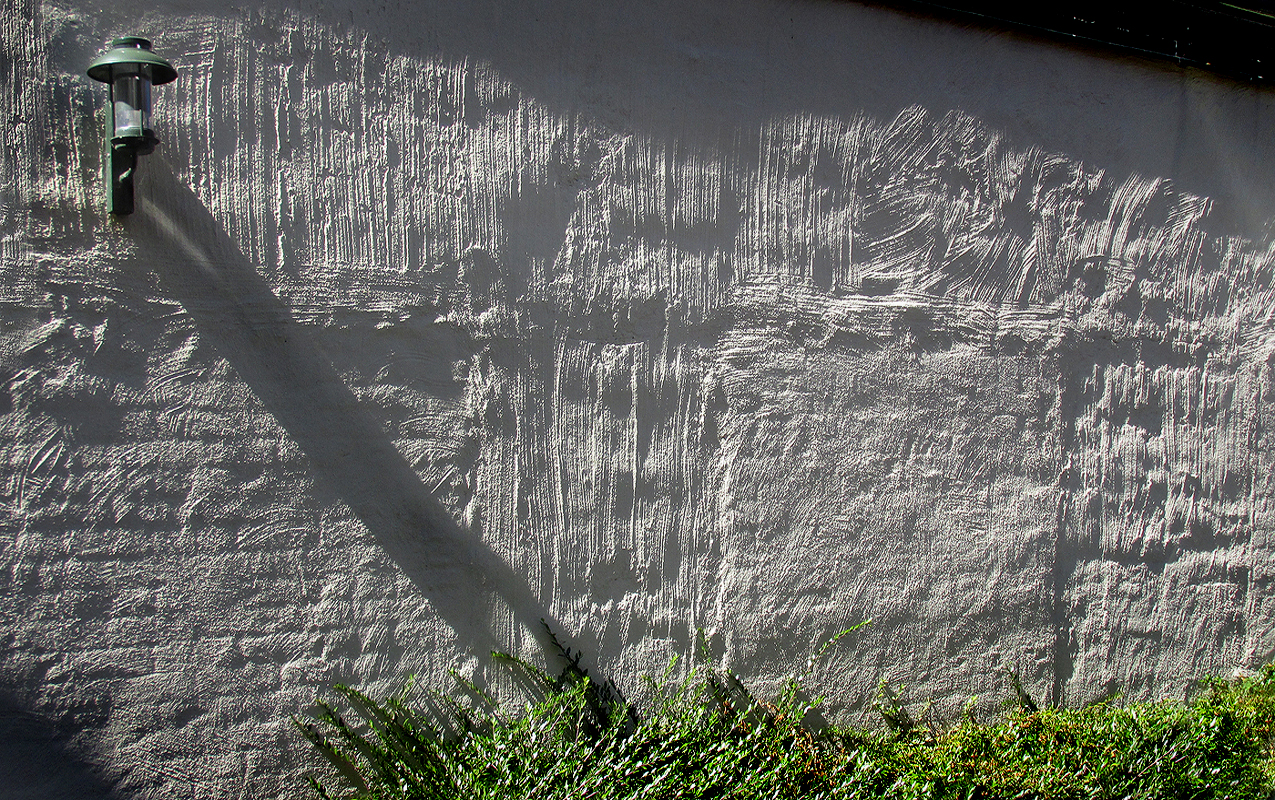
Raking light across a wall, gives a relief like impression.

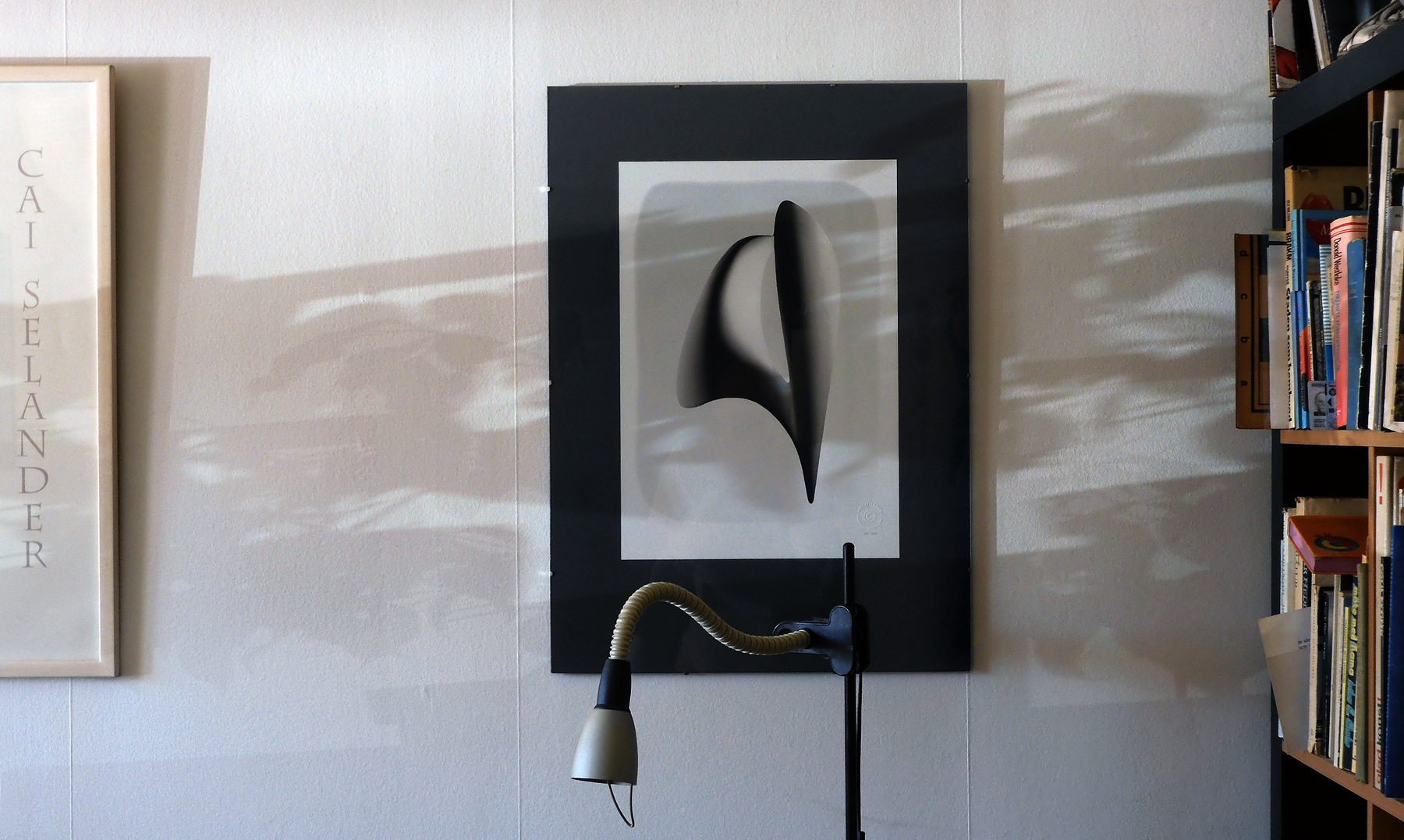
Sunlight at a narrow angle, flowers in the window cast long shadows on an inner wall.

Raking light is the illumination of objects from a light source at an oblique angle or almost parallel to the surface. This type of illumination provides information on the surface topography and relief of the artefact thus lit. It is widely used in the examination of works of art.

== Examination of paintings ==
Using raking light, the effects of impasto and the surface texture of a painting are accentuated by the increased illumination of surfaces facing the light source and the exaggeration of shadows on surfaces facing away from the light source. In some instances, raking light may help reveal pentimenti (changes in an artist's intention). In the case of wall paintings, raking light helps show preparatory techniques such as incisions in the plaster support.

== Conservation ==
Conservators examine objects under raking light during a visual inspection and for condition recording. In the examination of easel paintings, raking light may help document craquelure, paint cupping, uneven tension in a canvas, or warp in a panel. In the examination of wall paintings, raking light can help document surface deterioration phenomena such as the efflorescence of salts and micro-delamination, and may be used for monitoring the effects of conservation interventions.

== See also ==
- Conservation-restoration
