= Ostomachion =

Treatise on geometry attributed to Archimedes

Ostomachion (after Suter)

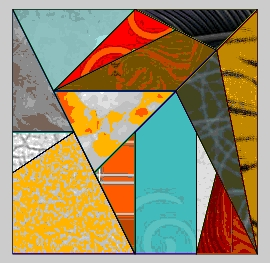
Ostomachion (after Suter): square reformed with some pieces turned over

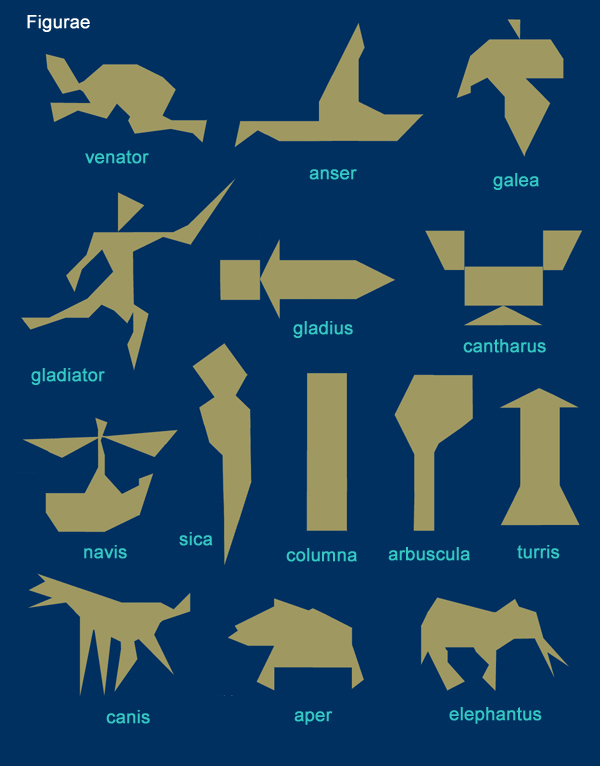
Ostomachion figures mentioned by Ausonius and others (Bibliotheca Augustana)

In ancient Greek geometry, the Ostomachion, also known as loculus Archimedius (from Latin 'Archimedes' box') or syntomachion, is a mathematical treatise attributed to Archimedes. This work has survived fragmentarily in an Arabic version and a copy, the Archimedes Palimpsest, of the original ancient Greek text made in Byzantine times.

The word Ostomachion (Ὀστομάχιον) comes from Greek ὀστέον (osteon) 'bone' and μάχη (mache) 'fight, battle, combat'. The manuscripts refer to the word as "Stomachion", an apparent corruption of the original Greek. Ausonius gives us the correct name "Ostomachion" (quod Graeci ostomachion vocavere, "which the Greeks called ostomachion").

The Ostomachion which he describes was a puzzle similar to tangrams and was played perhaps by several persons with pieces made of bone. It is not known which is older, Archimedes' geometrical investigation of the figure, or the game. Victorinus, Bassus, Ennodius and Lucretius have also discussed the game.

== Game ==
The game is a 14-piece dissection puzzle forming a square. One form of play to which classical texts attest is the creation of different objects, animals, plants etc. by rearranging the pieces: an elephant, a tree, a barking dog, a ship, a sword, a tower etc. Another suggestion is that it exercised and developed memory skills in the young. James Gow, in his Short History of Greek Mathematics (1884), footnotes that the purpose was to put the pieces back in their box, and this was also a view expressed by W. W. Rouse Ball in some intermediate editions of Mathematical Essays and Recreations.

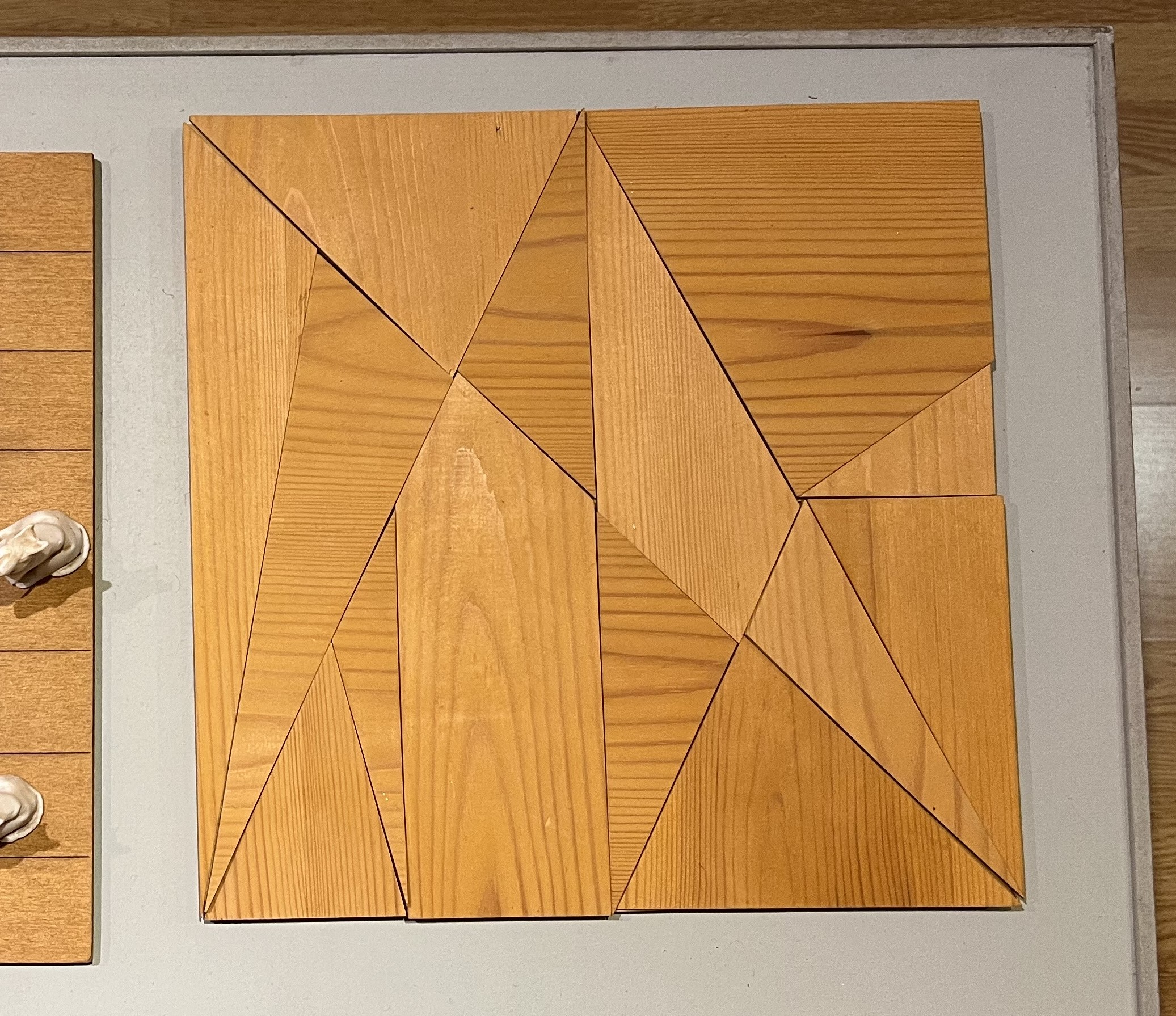
A reconstruction of Archimedes' ostomachion in Kotsanas Museum of Ancient Greek Technology, Athens

The number of different ways to arrange the parts of the Ostomachion within a square were determined to be 17,152 by Fan Chung, Persi Diaconis, Susan P. Holmes, and Ronald Graham, and confirmed by a computer search by William H. Cutler. However, this count has been disputed because surviving images of the puzzle show it in a rectangle, not a square, and rotations or reflections of pieces may not have been allowed.
