= On the Sphere and Cylinder =

Mathematical proofs published by Archimedes

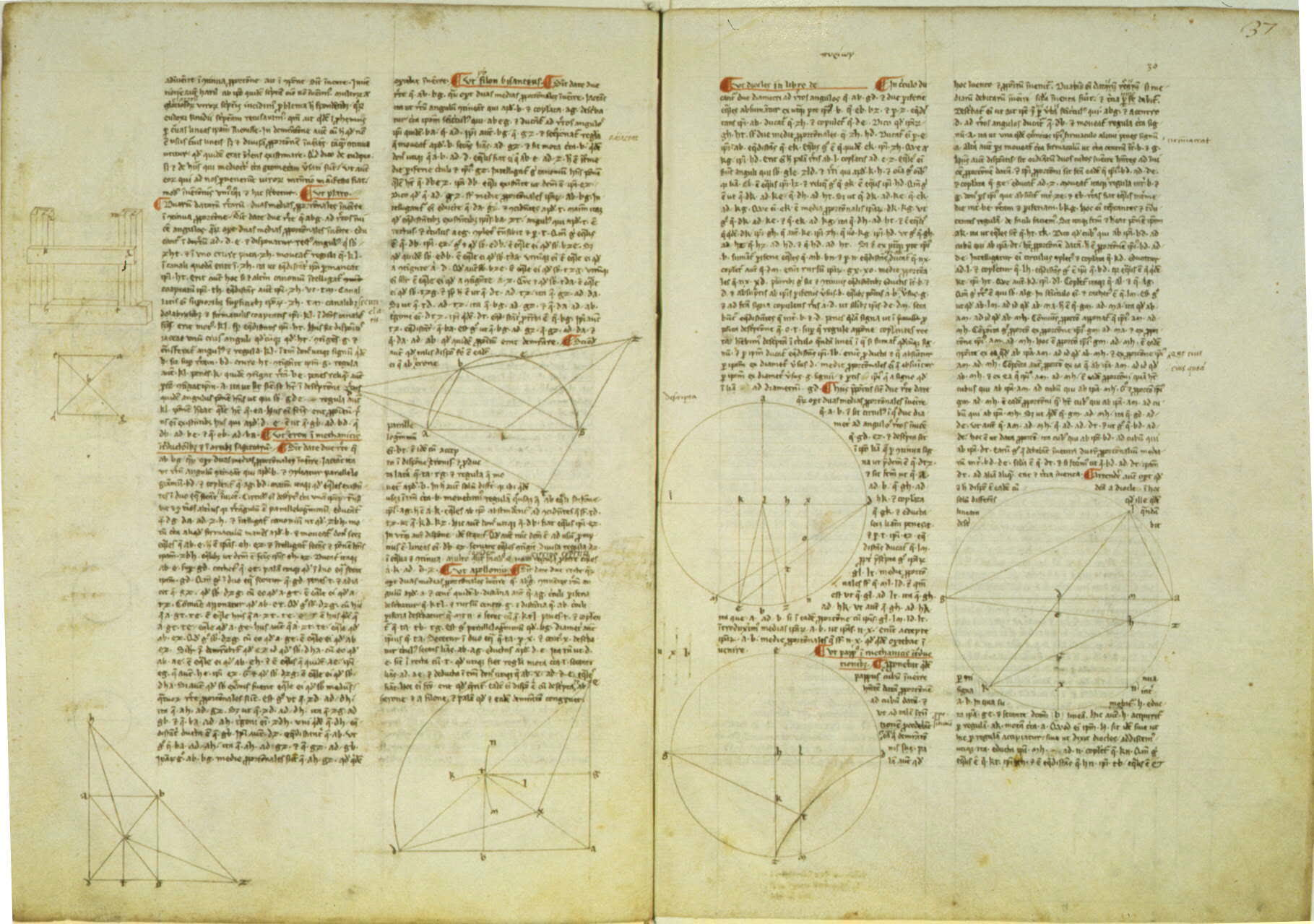
A page from "On the Sphere and Cylinder" in Latin

On the Sphere and Cylinder (Greek: Περὶ σφαίρας καὶ κυλίνδρου; Perì sphaíras kaì kulíndrou) is a treatise that was published by Archimedes in two volumes c. 225 BCE. It most notably details how to find the surface area of a sphere and the volume of the contained ball and the analogous values for a cylinder, and was the first to do so.

== Contents ==
The ratio of the volume of a sphere to the volume of its circumscribed cylinder is 2:3, as was determined by Archimedes

The principal formulae derived in On the Sphere and Cylinder are those mentioned above: the surface area of the sphere, the volume of the contained ball, and surface area and volume of the cylinder. Let $r$ be the radius of the sphere and cylinder, and $h$ be the height of the cylinder, with the assumption that the cylinder is a right cylinder—the side is perpendicular to both caps. In his work, Archimedes showed that the surface area of a cylinder is equal to:

$$A_C = 2 \pi r^2 + 2 \pi r h = 2 \pi r ( r + h )$$

and that the volume of the same is:

$V_C = \pi r^2 h. \,$

When the inscribing cylinder's height is equal to its diameter, so that the sphere touches the cylinder at the top and bottom, $h = 2r$ can be substituted:

$$A_{C'} = 6 \pi r^2$$
$$V_{C'} = 2 \pi r^3.\,$$

On the sphere, he showed that the surface area is four times the area of its great circle. In modern terms, this means that the surface area is equal to:

$$A_S = 4\pi r^2.\,$$

and that the volume of the contained ball is two-thirds the volume of a circumscribed cylinder, meaning that the volume is

$$V_S = \textstyle{\frac{4}{3}}\pi r^3.$$

Thus showing that both the volume and the surface area of the sphere were two-thirds that of the cylinder. This implies the area of the sphere is equal to the area of the cylinder minus its caps. This result would eventually lead to the Lambert cylindrical equal-area projection, a way of mapping the world that accurately represents areas. Archimedes was particularly proud of this latter result, and asked for a sketch of a sphere inscribed in a cylinder to be inscribed on his tombstone. Later, Roman philosopher Marcus Tullius Cicero rediscovered the tomb, which had been overgrown by surrounding vegetation.

The argument Archimedes used to prove the formula for the volume of a ball was rather involved in its geometry, and many modern textbooks have a simplified version using the concept of a limit, which did not exist in Archimedes' time. Archimedes used an inscribed half-polygon in a semicircle, then rotated both to create a conglomerate of frustums in a sphere, of which he then determined the volume.

It seems that this is not the original method Archimedes used to derive this result, but the best formal argument available to him in the Greek mathematical tradition. His original method likely involved a clever use of levers. A palimpsest stolen from the Greek Orthodox Church in the early 20th century, which reappeared at auction in 1998, contained many of Archimedes works, including The Method of Mechanical Theorems, in which he describes a method to determine volumes which involves balances, centers of mass and infinitesimal slices.

== Hat-box theorem ==
The proof of the surface-area result also shows that any zone of the sphere between two parallel planes has the same area as the portion of the circumscribed cylinder's lateral surface between the same planes; the projection of the sphere onto the cylinder is therefore area-preserving. This is known as the hat-box theorem. It is the basis of the Lambert cylindrical equal-area projection. In quantum mechanics it implies that uniformly distributed pure states of a qubit on the Bloch sphere yield uniformly distributed measurement probabilities.

== Recent discoveries ==
A missing page of the manuscript was recovered in 2026. While one side of the page has visible drawings, the other is completely covered by later additions of biblical paintings.

== See also ==
- Archimedean property
- Cylinder
