= Reviel Netz =

Israeli academic (born 1968)

- רויאל נץ
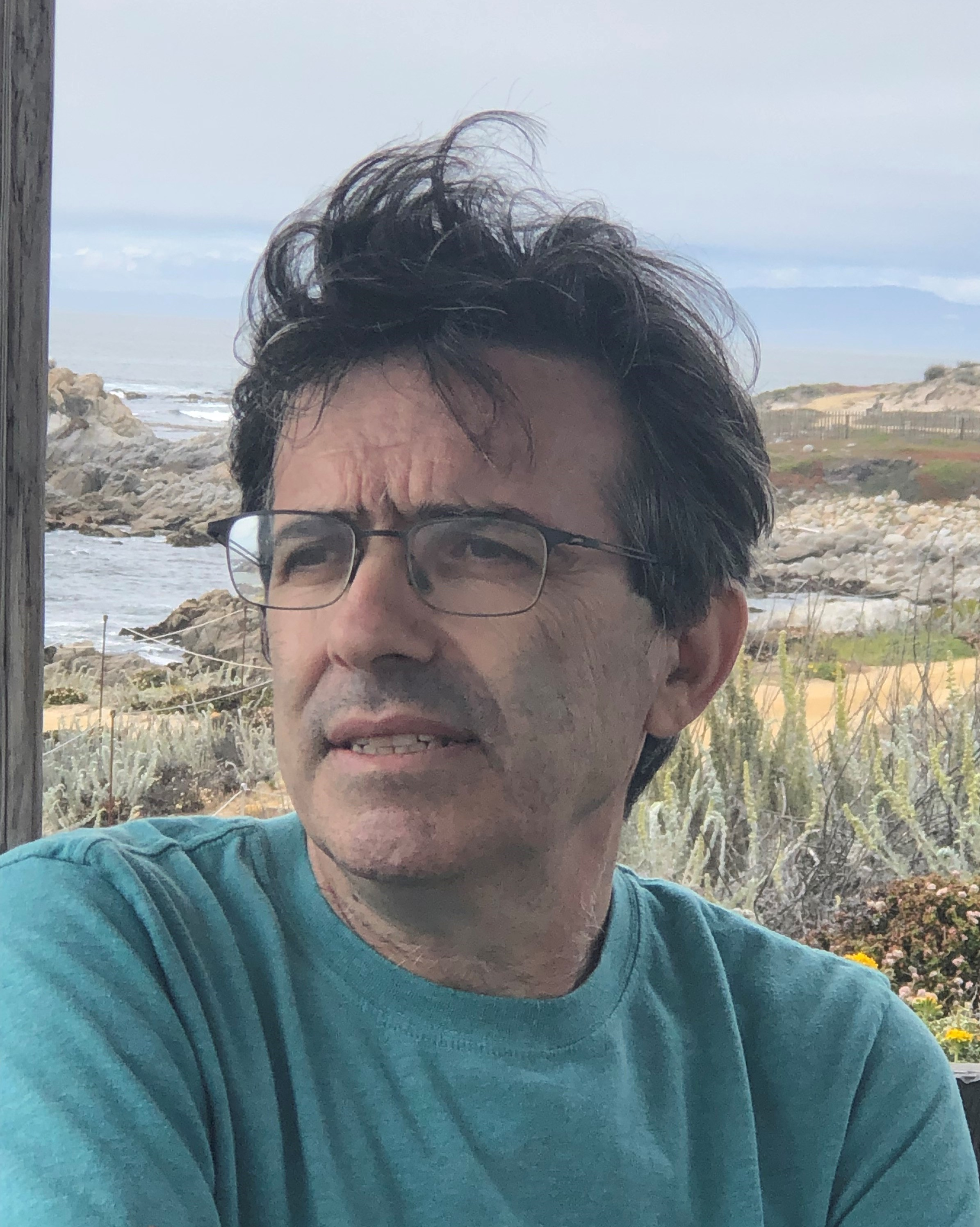
- Born: January 2, 1968 (age 58); Tel Aviv, Israel
- Education: Tel Aviv University
- Scientific career
- Fields: Philologist, historian, philosopher
- Workplaces: Stanford University

Reviel Netz (Hebrew: רויאל נץ; born January 2, 1968) is an Israeli-American scholar of the history of pre-modern mathematics, who is currently a professor of classics and of philosophy at Stanford University.

== Life and work ==
Netz was born January 2, 1968, in Tel Aviv, Israel to Israeli author Corinna Hasofferett and Yoel Netz, a translator of Russian classics.

From 1983 to 1992, Netz studied at the Tel Aviv University, obtaining a B.A. in Ancient History and an M.A. in History and the Philosophy of Science; from 1993 to 1995 studied classics at Christ College, Cambridge University, where he obtained his doctorate in 1995. From 1996 to 1999 Netz worked as a post-doctoral research fellow at Gonville and Caius College, Cambridge, and concurrently in 1998 and 1999 worked as a post-doctoral fellow at MIT. In the fall of 1999 he took a position as an assistant professor in the Stanford University Department of Classics, where he continues to teach and publish.

Netz is married to Maya Arad, an Israeli writer who is widely considered "the foremost Hebrew writer outside Israel". The couple has two daughters.

Netz's major research interests include the wider issues of the history of cognitive practices; for example the history of the book, visual culture, literacy and numeracy. He is the author of a number of works in field, including volumes I and II of The Archimedes Palimpsest. He also co-authored The Archimedes Codex with William Noel on the same subject matter, but oriented towards a public audience which received the Neumann Prize, as well as several works published by the Cambridge University Press, including The Shaping of Deduction in Greek Mathematics: a Study in Cognitive History (1999, Runciman Award), The Transformation of Early Mediterranean Mathematics: From Problems to Equations (2004), Ludic Proof: Greek Mathematics and the Alexandrian Aesthetic (2009), Scale, Space, and Canon in Ancient Literary Culture (2020), and A New History of Greek Mathematics (2022).

In 2014 he was awarded the Commandino Medal at the Urbino University for his contributions to the history of science.

Netz has also appeared as a subject matter expert on PBS's Nova concerning ancient mathematics.

In addition to his work on the history of mathematics, Netz has published some Hebrew poetry, including "Adayin Baḥutz" in 1999 as well as "Quatrains" in 2014.

== Selected publications ==
- The Shaping of Deduction in Greek Mathematics: A Study in Cognitive History, Cambridge: Cambridge University Press, 1999, ISBN 978-0-521-54120-6.
- The Works of Archimedes: Translation and Commentary, Vol. I: The Two Books "On The Sphere and the Cylinder", Cambridge: Cambridge University Press, 2004 and 2009 ISBN 978-0-5211-1798-2.
- Barbed Wire: an Ecology of Modernity, Middletown, CT: Wesleyan University Press, 2007, ISBN 978-0-8195-6959-2.
- With William Noel, The Archimedes Codex: Revealing the Secrets of the World's Greatest Palimpsest, London: Weidenfeld & Nicolson, 2007, ISBN 978-0-306-81737-3.
- The Transformation of Mathematics in the Early Mediterranean World: from Problems to Equations, Cambridge: Cambridge University Press, 2007 ISBN 978-0-5210-4174-4.
- Ludic Proof: Greek Mathematics and the Alexandrian Aesthetic, Cambridge: Cambridge University Press, 2009, ISBN 978-0-521-89894-2.
- Editor, with William Noel, Natalie Tchernetska, and Nigel Wilson, The Archimedes Palimpsest Vol. I: Catalogue and Commentary, Cambridge: Cambridge University Press, 2011, ISBN 978-1-107-01457-2.
- Editor, with William Noel et al., The Archimedes Palimpsest Vol. II: Facsimile and Transcription, Cambridge University Press, 2011, ISBN 978-1-107-01684-2.
- The Works of Archimedes: Translation and Commentary, Vol. 2: "On Spirals", Cambridge: Cambridge University Press, 2017, ISBN 978-0-5216-6145-4.
- "Scale, Space and Canon in Ancient Literary Culture", Cambridge: Cambridge University Press, 2020 ISBN 978-1-108-48147-2.
- A New History of Greek Mathematics, Cambridge: Cambridge University Press, 2022, ISBN 978-1-108-83384-4.
- Why the Ancient Greeks Matter: The Problematic Miracle that was Greece, Cambridge: Cambridge University Press, 2025, ISBN 978-1-009-50559-8.
