= Conon of Samos =

Greek astronomer and mathematician (c.280–c.220 BC)

Conon of Samos (Greek: Κόνων ὁ Σάμιος, Konōn ho Samios; c. 280 – c. 220 BC) was a Greek astronomer and mathematician. He is primarily remembered for naming the constellation Coma Berenices.

== Life and work ==
Conon was born on Samos, Ionia, and possibly died in Alexandria, Ptolemaic Egypt, where he was court astronomer to Ptolemy III Euergetes. He named the constellation Coma Berenices ("Berenice's Hair") after Ptolemy's wife Berenice II. She sacrificed her hair in exchange for her husband's safe return from the Third Syrian War, which began in 246 BC. When the lock of hair disappeared, Conon explained that the goddess had shown her favor by placing it in the sky. Not all Greek astronomers accepted the designation. In Ptolemy's Almagest, Coma Berenices is not listed as a distinct constellation. However, Ptolemy does attribute several seasonal indications (parapegma) to Conon. Conon was a friend of the mathematician Archimedes whom he probably met in Alexandria.

=== Astronomical work ===
In astronomy, Conon wrote in seven books his De astrologia, including observations on solar eclipses. Ptolemy further attributes seventeen "signs of the seasons" to Conon, although this may not have been given in De astrologia. Seneca writes that "Conon was a careful observer" and that he "recorded solar eclipses observed by the Egyptians", although the accuracy of this statement is doubted. The Roman Catullus writes that Conon "discerned all the lights of the vast universe, and disclosed the risings and settings of the stars, how the fiery brightness of the sun is darkened, and how the stars retreat at fixed times."

=== Mathematical work ===
Pappus states that the spiral of Archimedes was discovered by Conon. Apollonius of Perga reported that Conon worked on conic sections, and his work became the basis for Apollonius' fourth book of the Conics. Apollonius further reports that Conon sent some of his work to Thrasydaeus, but that it was incorrect. Since this work has not survived it is impossible to assess the accuracy of Apollonius' comment.

== Namesake ==
- Conon (crater), named in his honor
