= Method of exhaustion =

Primitive way of calculating area

The method of exhaustion is a method of finding the area of a shape by inscribing inside it a sequence of polygons (one at a time) whose areas converge to the area of the containing shape. If the sequence is correctly constructed, the difference in area between the nth polygon and the containing shape will become arbitrarily small as n becomes large. As this difference becomes arbitrarily small, the possible values for the area of the shape are systematically "exhausted" by the lower bound areas successively established by the sequence members.

The method of exhaustion typically required a form of proof by contradiction, known as reductio ad absurdum. This amounts to finding an area of a region by first comparing it to the area of a second region, which can be "exhausted" so that its area becomes arbitrarily close to the true area. The proof involves assuming that the true area is greater than the second area, proving that assertion false, assuming it is less than the second area, then proving that assertion false, too.

== History ==
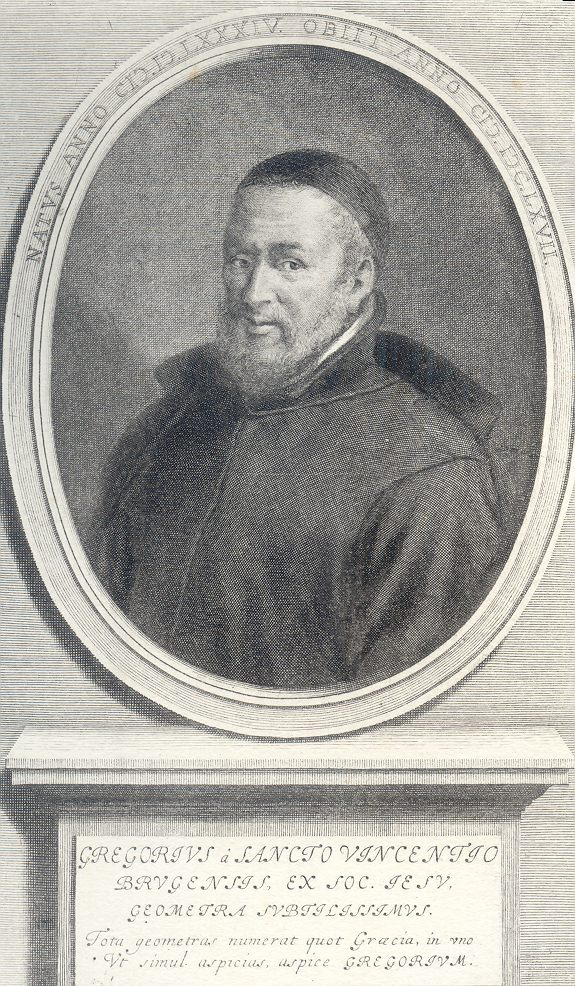
Gregory of Saint Vincent

The idea originated in the late 5th century BC with Antiphon, although it is not entirely clear how well he understood it. The theory was made rigorous a few decades later by Eudoxus of Cnidus, who used it to calculate areas and volumes. It was later reinvented in China by Liu Hui in the 3rd century AD in order to find the area of a circle. The first use of the term was in 1647 by Gregory of Saint Vincent in Opus geometricum quadraturae circuli et sectionum.

The method of exhaustion is seen as a precursor to the methods of calculus. The development of analytical geometry and rigorous integral calculus in the 17th-19th centuries subsumed the method of exhaustion so that it is no longer explicitly used to solve problems. An important alternative approach was Cavalieri's principle, also termed the method of indivisibles which eventually evolved into the infinitesimal calculus of Roberval, Torricelli, Wallis, Leibniz, and others.

=== Euclid ===
Euclid used the method of exhaustion to prove the following six propositions in the 12th book of his Elements.

Proposition 2: The area of circles is proportional to the square of their diameters.

Proposition 5: The volumes of two tetrahedra of the same height are proportional to the areas of their triangular bases.

Proposition 10: The volume of a cone is a third of the volume of the corresponding cylinder which has the same base and height.

Proposition 11: The volume of a cone (or cylinder) of the same height is proportional to the area of the base.

Proposition 12: The volume of a cone (or cylinder) that is similar to another is proportional to the cube of the ratio of the diameters of the bases.

Proposition 18: The volume of a sphere is proportional to the cube of its diameter.

=== Archimedes ===
Archimedes used the method of exhaustion to compute the area inside a circle

Archimedes used the method of exhaustion as a way to compute the area inside a circle by filling the circle with a sequence of polygons with an increasing number of sides and a corresponding increase in area. The quotients formed by the area of these polygons divided by the square of the circle radius can be made arbitrarily close to π as the number of polygon sides becomes large, proving that the area inside the circle of radius r is πr^{2}, π being defined as the ratio of the circumference to the diameter (C/d).

He also provided the bounds 3 + ^{10}/_{71} < π < 3 + ^{10}/_{70} (giving a range of ^{1}/_{497}) by comparing the perimeters of the circle with the perimeters of the inscribed and circumscribed 96-sided regular polygons.

Other results he obtained with the method of exhaustion included:

- The area bounded by the intersection of a line and a parabola is 4/3 that of the triangle having the same base and height (the quadrature of the parabola).
- The area of an ellipse is proportional to a rectangle having sides equal to its major and minor axes.
- The volume of a sphere is 4 times that of a cone having a base of the same radius and height equal to this radius.
- The volume of a cylinder having a height equal to its diameter is 3/2 that of a sphere having the same diameter.
- The area bounded by one spiral rotation and a line is 1/3 that of the circle having a radius equal to the line segment length.
- Use of the method of exhaustion also led to the successful evaluation of an infinite geometric series (for the first time).

=== Others ===
Galileo Galilei used the method of exhaustion to find the centre of mass of a truncated cone.

Shortly before the development of modern calculus, Christopher Wren employed the method of exhaustion to discover the exact arc length of the cycloid.

== Example 1: The area of an Archimedean spiral is a third of the enclosing circle ==
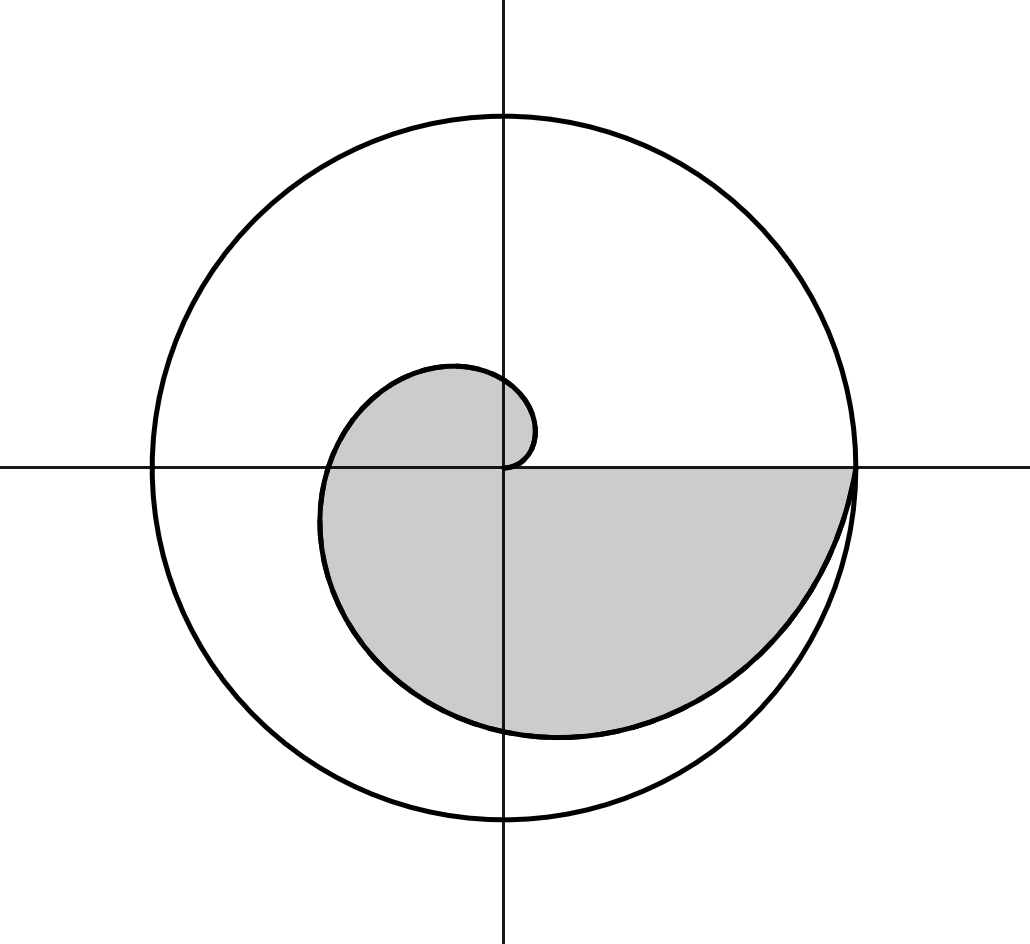
The area of one turn of the Archimedean spiral $r=\theta$ is a third of the area of the circle enclosing it.

Archimedes computed the area of one turn of the spiral $S$ given by $r = \theta$ and found that $a(S) = \frac{1}{3}\pi r^2$, that is, one third of $a(C)$, the area of the circle enclosing it.

For a sketch of the proof, suppose we wish to show that $a(S) = \frac{1}{3}a(C)$. By way of contradiction, assume that $a(S) < \frac{1}{3}a(C)$. Divide the interval $[0, 2\pi]$ into $n$ equal pieces $\theta=\frac{2\pi}{n}$, and for each subinterval find the smallest and largest circular sectors enclosing the spiral. See the second image for clarification. Let $P$ be the set of sectors on the interior of the spiral, and $Q$ the set of sectors on the exterior. Then, $a(P)$ is an underestimate for the area of the spiral, and $a(Q)$ an overestimate. Archimedes was able to show that, for $n$ sufficiently large, $a(Q)-a(P)<\varepsilon$ for any $0<\varepsilon$.

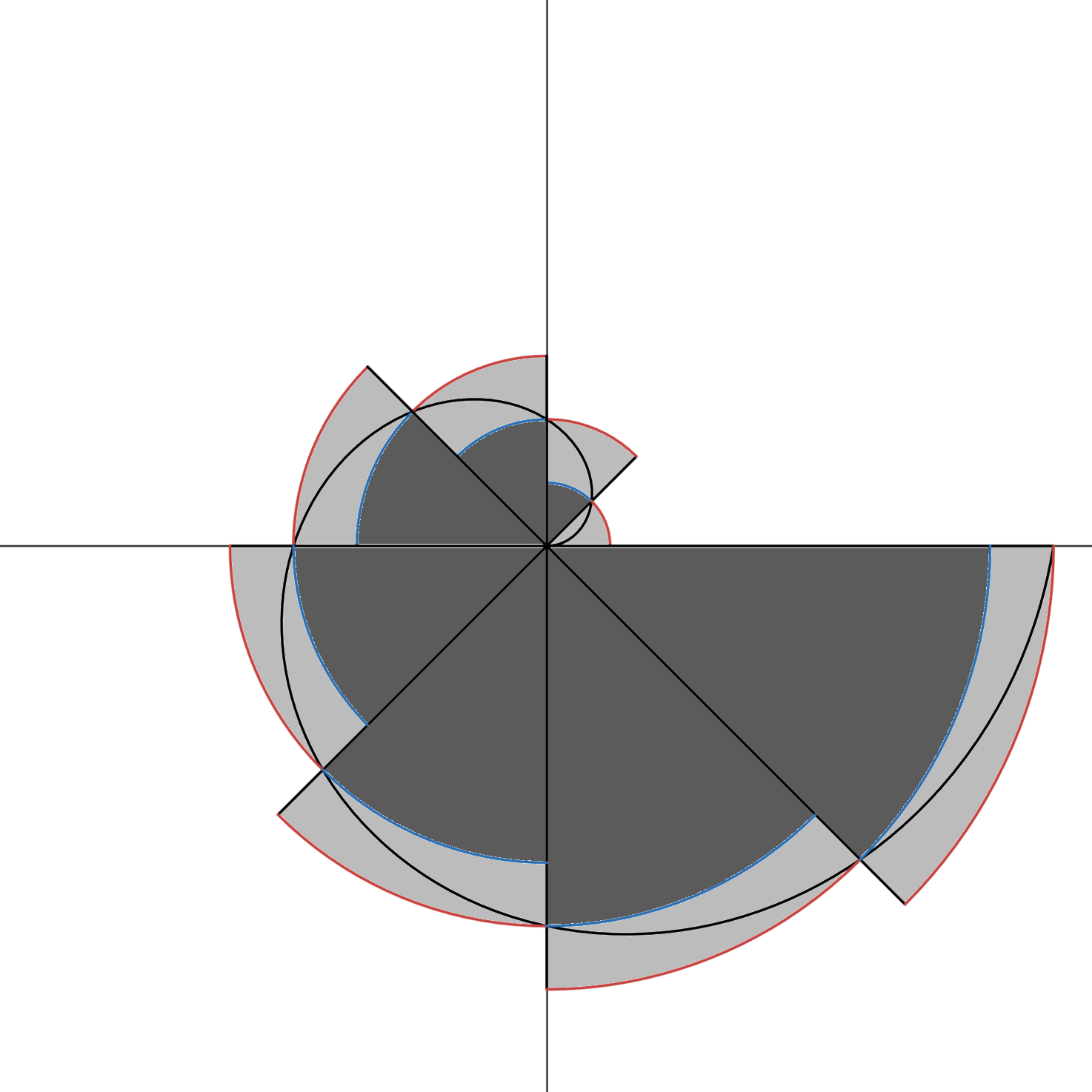
For $n=8$, the image shows P (blue) and Q (red). The dark grey area is $a(P)$, and the dark and light grey areas together represent $a(Q)$.

Now, define $\varepsilon := \frac{1}{3}a(C)-a(S)$. Then we have $\frac{1}{3}a(C)-a(S)>a(Q)-a(P)$ by the assumption, and thus $\frac{1}{3}a(C)>a(Q)+a(S)-a(P)>a(Q)$ since the spiral encloses $P$. But we can explicitly calculate the area of $Q$, as it equals the sum of the areas of the $n$ exterior circular segments, each of which has area $\frac{\theta}{2} r_i^2,$ for $i\in\{1,\dots,n\}$. That is,

$$\begin{align}a(Q)&=\frac{\theta}{2} r_1^{2}+\frac{\theta}{2} r_2^{2}+\cdots+\frac{\theta}{2} r_n^{2}\\[5pt]
&=\frac{\theta}{2}\left(\theta^2+(2\theta)^2+\cdots+(n\theta)^2\right) \\[5pt]
&=\frac{\theta^3}{12}n(n+1)(2n+1)
\end{align}$$

using the formula for the sum of squares, which Archimedes had also discovered.

Thus returning to the inequality we have

$$\frac{\theta^{3}}{12}n\left(n+1\right)\left(2n+1\right) < \frac{1}{3}a(C).$$

Since the radius of the circle was $2\pi$, the area of the circle is $a(C)=4 \pi^{3}$. Once we plug it to the above inequality, together with $\theta = \frac{2\pi}{n}$, we get:

$$\frac{8 \pi^3}{12 n^3}n\left(n+1\right)\left(2n+1\right) < \frac 43\pi^3.$$

which gets further reduced to equivalent:

$$\left(n+1\right)\left(2n+1\right) < 2 n^2.$$

However, this is false for all positive $n$, as the first term on the left side is greater than $n$ and the second one is greater than $2n$, so their product is greater than $2n^2$, thus we have reached a contradiction.

The proof that $a(S) > \frac{1}{3}a(C)$ instead is entirely tantamount. Since the area of the spiral is neither less than nor greater than one third the area of the circle, Archimedes concluded that they were equal.

== Example 2: Circles are to one another as the squares on their diameters ==
This statement that $\frac{a(C_1)}{a(C_2)}=\left(\frac{r_1}{r_2}\right)^2$ is attributed to Eudoxus, but his exposition does not survive – it is reproduced in Euclid book XII proposition 2.

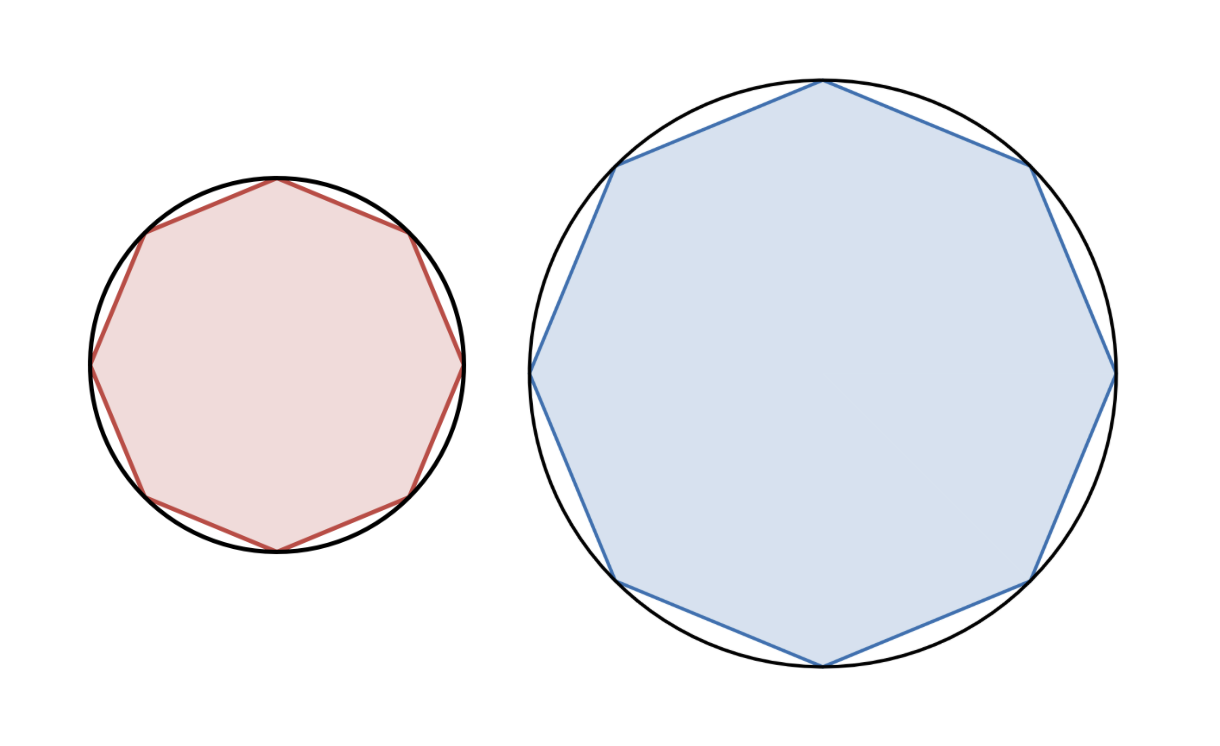
The circles $C_1, C_2$ and the inscribed polygons $P_1, P_2$. Note that $P_1, P_2$ have the same number of sides.

For a sketch of the proof, assume by way of contradiction that $\frac{a(C_1)}{a(C_2)}>\left(\frac{r_1}{r_2}\right)^2\iff a(C_1)>\left(\frac{r_1}{r_2}\right)^2a(C_2).$ Let $P_1, P_2$ be $n$-sided regular convex polygons inscribing $C_1, C_2$ respectively. Define $\epsilon:= a(C_1)-\left(\frac{r_1}{r_2}\right)^2a(C_2)$. Then, by Euclid book X proposition 1, we can find $N$ such that whenever $n > N$, $a(C_1)-a(P_1)<\epsilon$. Thus, using the definition of $\epsilon$ we get $a(C_1)-a(P_1)<a(C_1)-\left(\frac{r_1}{r_2}\right)^2a(C_2), \quad \left(\frac{r_1}{r_2}\right)^2a(C_2)<a(P_1).$

But for any two regular convex polygons, not circles, it is trivial to show that $\frac{a(P_1)}{a(P_2)}=\left(\frac{r_1}{r_2}\right)^2$, provided $n$ is fixed. Inserting this into the previous statement gives

$$\left(\frac{r_1}{r_2}\right)^2a(C_2)<\left(\frac{r_1}{r_2}\right)^2a(P_2)\implies a(C_2)<a(P_2).$$

However, this is a contradiction, since $P_2 \subset C_2$. The next step is to prove that $\frac{a(C_1)}{a(C_2)}>\left(\frac{r_1}{r_2}\right)^2$ is also false. However, the labelling of $C_1, C_2$ was entirely arbitrary; by relabelling this case also follows without further proof necessary. Therefore, we have that $\frac{a(C_1)}{a(C_2)}=\left(\frac{r_1}{r_2}\right)^2$.

== Analysis ==
Both approximating an integral with a Riemann sum or with the trapezoidal rule can be seen as modern versions of the method of exhaustion.

== See also ==
- The Method of Mechanical Theorems
- Quadrature of the Parabola
- Trapezoidal rule
- Pythagorean theorem
