= Athanasios Papadopoulos-Kerameus =

Ottoman Greek scholar

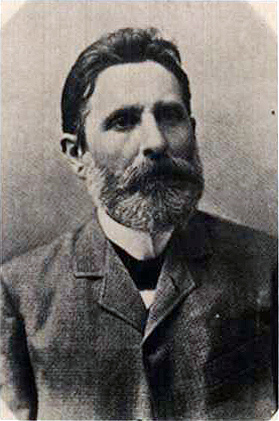
Picture of Athanasios Papadopoulos-Kerameus

Athanasios Papadopoulos-Kerameus (Greek: Αθανάσιος Παπαδόπουλος-Κεραμεύς; 1856–1912) was an Ottoman Greek scholar of Greek Orthodox religious affiliation. He was an Ottoman and subsequently Tsarist subject.

Appointed secretary of the Greek Literary Club of Constantinople (1881), he was made responsible (1883) for creating an inventory of Greek manuscripts belonging to schools, churches and monasteries. In 1887, he was summoned to Jerusalem to collect and catalogue all manuscripts in Palestine. The Russian Imperial Orthodox Society for Palestine charged him with the task of editing unpublished texts. In 1892, he became a private lecturer (Privatdozent) in Modern Greek and Byzantine History at St. Petersburg University. He was subsequently director of the theological section of the St. Petersburg Imperial Library.

== Principal publications ==
- Ιεροσολυμιτική Βιβλιοθήκη [Hierosolymitike Bibliotheke], (catalogue of the Jerusalem patriarchal libraries) vol.1, St. Petersburg, 1891
- Ανάλεκτα Ιεροσολυμίτικης Σταχυολογίας [Analekta Hierosolymitikes Stachyologias] (edition of mainly unpublished Greek texts), 5 vols.,1891; anastatic impression, Brussels, 1963

== Sources ==
- B. Joassart, Analecta Bollandiana, Tome 128, Brussels, 2010
