= Antiphon (disambiguation) =

In music, an antiphon is a responsory by a choir or congregation in Christian music.

Antiphon may also refer to:

== People ==
Antiphon was a common personal name in ancient Greece, with the result that it is not always easy for scholars to distinguish between different bearers of the name.

- Antiphon (orator) (480–411 BC), Athenian orator, one of the Ten Attic Orators and a significant political figure
- Antiphon the Sophist, the writer of the Sophistic works of Antiphon, believed by many scholars to have been Antiphon the Orator
- Antiphon, who wrote a treatise on the Interpretation of Dreams, possibly Antiphon the Sophist
- Antiphon (tragic poet), incorrectly confused with Antiphon the Orator by Plutarch and Philostratus
- Antiphon (epic poet), mentioned in the Suda
- Antiphon (brother of Plato), brother of the philosopher Plato
- Antiphon (arsonist) (died 342 BC), mentioned in a speech of the orator Demosthenes
- Antiphon (writer), author of a lost treatise on men distinguished for virtue

== Other uses ==
- Antiphon (mythology), a comrade of Odysseus
- Antiphon (album), a 2013 album by Midlake
- The Antiphon, a 1958 play by Djuna Barnes

== See also ==
- Antiphona, a Venezuelan mixed choir
- Antiphonary, a Catholic liturgical book
- Antiphonus, in Greek mythology, a son of King Priam of Troy
