= School of Chios =

Mathematical school in Ancient Greece

The School of Chios (Ancient Greek: Σχολή της Χίου) was a mathematical school in ancient Greece that flourished from around 480 BC to 450 BC.

== Main Representatives of the School ==
The School of Chios was a mathematical school established in the early 5th century, succeeding the Pythagorean School. Its most prominent representative was Hippocrates of Chios (~470-400 BC), who flourished around 440 BC. His teacher was Oenopides of Chios, who was a generation older. Also, Anaxagoras (500-428 BC) was likely a member of the School.

== The Mathematical Work of the School ==
There is no information on whether the School of Chios was based in Chios or if its representatives hailed from there. However, it was the brief period between the Pythagorean School and the Platonic Academy. The Academy declined, and its traces were lost shortly after the mid-5th century, during a flourishing geometric tradition, where the central focus was on the three famous "unsolvable" problems of antiquity: the Doubling of the cube or Delian problem, the Trisection of the angle, and the Squaring of the circle.

Anaxagoras is mentioned as the first to deal with the problem of squaring the circle.

According to Proclus, Oenopides was involved in mathematics and gained fame from it; he also introduced the use of the rule and compass for geometric constructions.

Hippocrates is mentioned as the first to reduce the problem of doubling the cube to its equivalent, the interpolation of two mean proportionals between two straight line segments a and b=2a, so that the continuous proportions a/x=x/y=y/2a hold. Hippocrates also squared lunules, according to Simplicius (4th century AD), in a text that is preserved to us.

The peak of the School of Chios did not last long, and the scientific center soon after the mid-5th century BC shifted to Athens. The three above-mentioned main representatives of the School of Chios settled in Athens and continued their mathematical work.

== Bibliography ==
- Sotiris X. Goudouvas, "Γεωμετρικές Διαδρομές / Geometric Pathways", Athens 2015
- Σωτήρης Χ. Γκουντουβάς, "Το νόημα της κατασκευής στην πορεία εξέλιξης της Γεωμετρίας / The meaning of construction in the course of Geometry's evolution", Dissertation, NKUA, Athens 2009
- Proclus the Successor, "Comments on the 1st book of Euclid's Elements", Leipzig 1897
- Thomas Heath, "Ιστορία των Ελληνικών Μαθηματικών / A History of Greek Mathematics", KEPEK, Athens 2001
- Β. L. Van der Waerden, "Η αφύπνιση της επιστήμης / The awakening of science", PEK, Heraklion 2003
