= Andromacha =

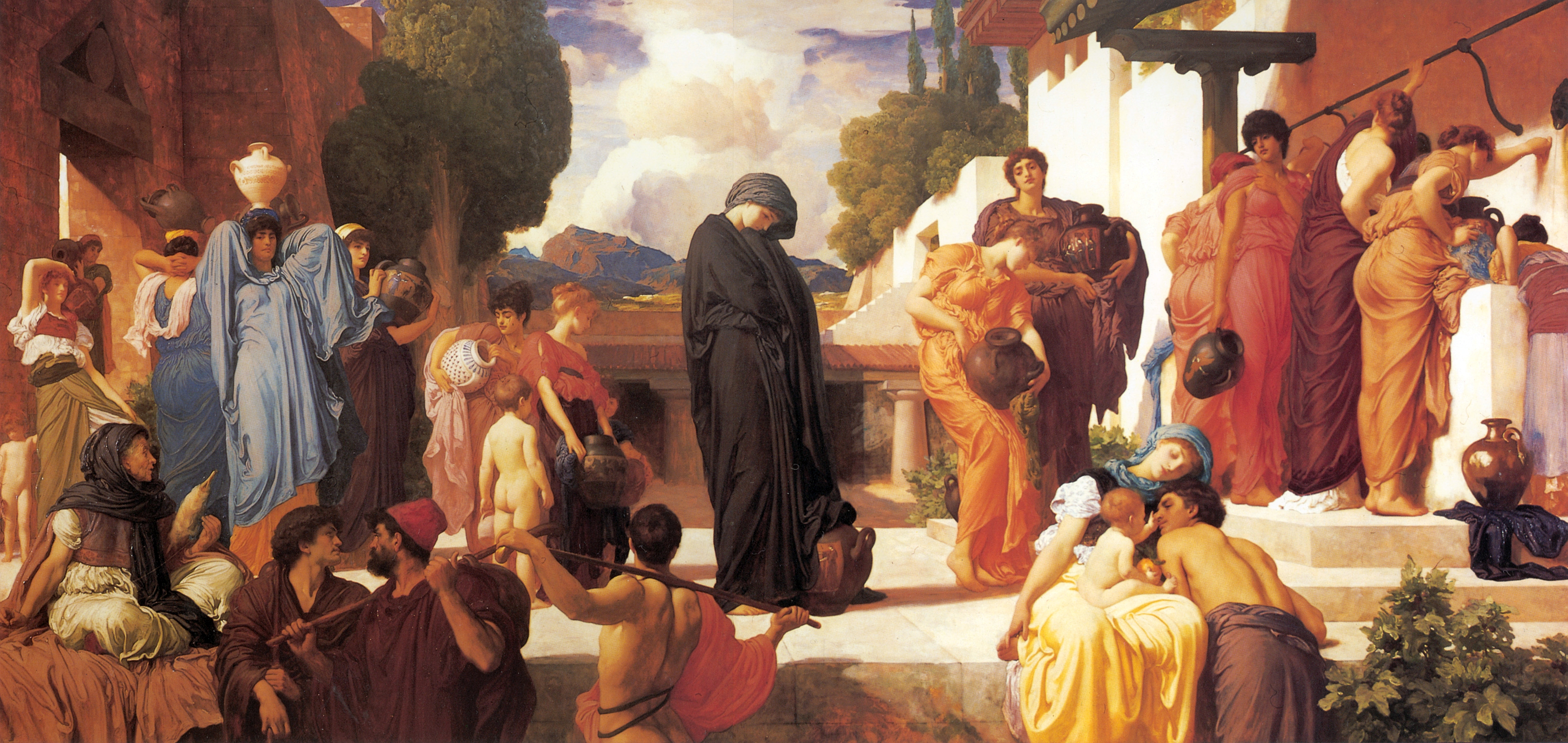
- 19th-century painting by Frederic Leighton depicting a captive Andromache
- Original language: Old Latin
- Written by: Ennius
- Based on: Perhaps based on the Andromache by Euripides
- Characters: Andromache; Astyanax; Possibly Polyxena
- First publication: Perhaps either c. 200 BCE or c. 195-191 BCE
- Subject: Character of Andromache
- Genre: Roman tragedy

The Andromacha, alternatively titled Andromacha Aechmalotis or Andromacha Aechmalotos ("Andromache the Captive"), is a lost play by Ennius.

== Plot ==
This work detailed the story of Andromache, the wife of Hector, following the Trojan War. In some manuscripts, the title of the play is adjusted with the epithet Aechmalotis ("captive"), which was perhaps added by later grammarians so as to further specify the contents of the work. Individual scenes can be identified on the basis of the surviving fragments, though they cannot be arranged into one coherent plot or order. In one passage, the character of Andromache herself laments the sack of Troy, exclaiming "O pater, o patria, o Priami domus!" ("O father, o fatherland, o house of Priam!"). According to the classicist Seth A. Jeppesen, through the use of vocatives, this line employs apostrophe and direct address to figuratively equate the city of Troy, and henceforth its destruction, with the character of Priam. Within this same section of the text, Andromache proceeds to more extensively detail the destruction of Troy, describing "the altars ... broken and scattered" ("arae ... fractae et disiectae") and "the temples destroyed by flames" ("fana flamma deflagrata"). Jeppesen argues that, through the usage of perfect passive participles, the text seeks to emphasize the destruction of the beauty once associated with the city. Another fragment details the death of Andromache's son, Astyanax, and one portion of the text may describe the slaying of Polyxena.

== Sources ==
The play was perhaps modeled after one of the two known Greek plays of the same title, one of which was authored by Euripides—and is preserved in the Troades—the other was composed by Antiphon. However, neither of these two Greek tragedies provide a clear match for all of the surviving fragments of Ennius's work. One line in particular, reading "he who gave Andromache her name, give it correctly," is explicitly cited by Varro as an imitation of a line from Euripides. However, no such Euripidean line is known in any of his surviving works, and therefore either Varro was wrong in his comparison or the Ennian line reflects either an otherwise lost passage from Euripides or an edited version of Euripides's work that added new lines.

The Ennian play Andromacha was perhaps referenced in a section of the Amphitryon of Plautus, wherein a character states "I’ve seen other deities mention in tragedies what good things they’d done for you, namely Neptune, Courage, Victory, Mars, and Bellona." According to the classicist Otto Skutsch, the unspecified Latin play containing the god Neptune was perhaps the Andromacha, for the Troades—upon which the Andromacha may have been based—contains the only known Ancient Greek work with a prologue spoken by Poseidon. Skutsch suggests that, if the Amphitryon—which dates to 190 BCE—does indeed reference the Andromacha, then the Ennian play must be dated to around 195-191 BCE. Alternatively, according to the classicist Ulrike Auhagen, it is instead likely that the play was commenting on the recent campaigns of Titus Quinctius Flamininus in Epirus during the Second Macedonian War (200-197 BCE). Auhagen argues that, since the kings of Epirus claimed descendant from Neoptolemus's children with Andromache, the play may have been crafted to reference or glorify the then recent Roman military activity. If this theory is accepted, then it implies that the play Andromacha was composed around the year 200 BCE.

== Influence ==
This Ennian play was evidently very popular in antiquity, for the 1st-century BCE statesman Cicero states that any individual trained in the arts will be able to immediately recognize the Andromacha when the fluteplayer performs the first note. Cicero frequently quotes the Andromacha, often without specifying that the quotes specifically derive from this Ennian play, or even naming Ennius as the author, seemingly out of an expectation that his audience would automatically know the source of these quotes. The play was also still being performed in Cicero's time—in one of his letters to Atticus, he describes witnessing a production of the play in the theater during the Ludi Apollinares in the year 54 BCE.

In his Pro Sestio, Cicero describes the performance of a then famous actor Aesopus, who—according to a later scholiast—was specifically partaking in a production of the Eurysaces of Accius. Yet, part of the passage quoted by Cicero includes the specific lines "O pater!" ("Oh father!") and "haec omnia vidi inflammari" ("I see all these things set ablaze"), both of which are also attested verbatim in a fragment of Ennius. Elsewhere in his work, Cicero explicitly attributes these lines to Ennius, thus removing any ambiguity as to their ultimate source. It may be that the actor Aesopus had adjusted the dialogue of the Eurysaces in this instance, adding in new lines from Ennius to make some type of social commentary on Cicero's current situation. According to Cicero, the first line, "O pater!" was intended to mourn his exile from Rome, for other senators had called Cicero the "father of the country" ("patrem patriae"). Cicero also states that the second line, "haec omnia vidi inflammari," was only said after the actor had finished describing the burning and destruction of Cicero's house.

The Ennian line "O pater, o patria, o Priami domus" is probably also referenced by Plautus, who writes—in the Bacchides—the line "o Troia, o patria, o Pergamum! o Priami, periisti, senex!" ("Troy, o father-land, o Pergamum, o aged Priam, you have perished"). The phrase "haec omnia vidi inflammari" ("I saw all these things set ablaze") is spoken by the character of Andromache whilst witnessing the luxuries of Troy burning. She specifically utilizes the term "īnflammārī" ("to be set on fire"), a verb form—first attested in Ennius—that appears elsewhere in Republican Latin also in reference to the Trojan War, such as in the writings of the 1st-century BCE author Lucretius, who writes "or would the wooden horse have set flame to Pergama unbeknownst to the Trojans with nocturnal birthing of Greek-born men" ("nec clam durateus Troiianis Pergama partu inflammasset equos nocturno Graiiugenarum"). Similarly, in a fragment of a tragedy from Accius, who references the burning of Greek ships with the line "long ago the sons of Atreus would have seen their ships set ablaze" ("iam diu inflammari Atridae naves vidissent suas"). Accius, in this passage, also utilizes a form of the verb videō ("to see") in tandem with īnflammārī, just as Ennius does.

Additional surviving fragments of the Andromacha closely parallel other passages from the writings of Lucretius. For instance, Ennius describes the slaying of Priam at the altar of Jupiter by stating "the altar of Jupiter defiled by blood" ("Iovis aram sanguine turpari"), and Lucretius utilizes a similar sequence of words when describing the sacrifice of Iphigenia, writing "the altar ... was foully defiled" ("aram ... turparunt sanguine"). Moreover, in another surviving fragment, one character—possibly Andromache—greets the "the Acherusian expanses and the vast depths of Orcus" ("Acherusia templa alta Orci salvete infera"). This particular snippet is preserved in the writings of Varro, though Cicero may provide an expanded version of this passage, writing "the deep Acherusian fields of Orcus, pale places of death clouded in darkness" ("Acheru[n]sia templa alta Orci, pallida leti, nubila tenebris loca"). The extended line from Cicero closely parallels, in terms of word choice, a line from Lucretius that states "there do in fact exist Acherusian expanses ... where neither our souls abide nor our bodies, but certain images pale in wondrous ways" ("etsi praeterea tamen esse Acherusia templa ... quo neque permaneant animae neque corpora nostra sed quaedam simulacra modis pallentia miris"). However, according to the classicist Harry Jocelyn, the shared elements between these passages are not particularly unique, and it unclear why Cicero or Varro would have chosen to omit part of the text. Thus, Jocelyn argues that the lines are best kept separate, with only the Varronian passage—which is explicitly assigned by Varro to the Andromacha—being interpreted as a fragment of this play. In contrast, according to Jocelyn, the Ciceronian passage, which is not directly stated to belong to any particular work of Ennius, should be left as an unassigned fragment.
