= Guillaume le Roberger de Vausenville =

Alexandre-Henry-Guillaume le Roberger de Vausenville (18th century) was a French astronomer, mathematician, and inventor who became a prominent figure in the debates surrounding the mathematical problem of squaring the circle during the Age of Enlightenment.

== Early life and background ==
Little is known about Vausenville's early life and family background. He lived and worked in Paris during the 18th century, where he established himself as an astronomer and correspondent of the French Academy of Sciences (Académie royale des sciences).

== Scientific achievements and inventions ==
=== Musical manuscript ruling ===
Before his mathematical pursuits, Vausenville received a royal privilege for the printing of music paper, developing an innovative method for ruling musical manuscript paper. In 1767, he published Invention nouvelle. L'art de rayer des Papiers de Musique (New Invention: The Art of Ruling Music Paper), which detailed his technique for creating lined music paper.

=== Mathematics and the quadrature of the circle ===
From January 1771 onwards, Vausenville devoted himself to developing a series of theorems related to the quadrature of the circle, one of the classical problems of ancient Greek mathematics. This mathematical challenge involved constructing a square with the same area as a given circle using only a finite number of steps with compass and straightedge.

His work culminated in his 1778 treatise Essai physico-géométrique (Physical-Geometric Essay), which claimed to provide a geometric solution to the problem. The full title of this work was: Essai physico-géométrique contenant: 1. La détermination du centre de gravité d'un secteur de cercle quelconque; 2. La résolution géométrique du problème de la quadrature définie du cercle (Physical-Geometric Essay containing: 1. The determination of the center of gravity of any circular sector; 2. The geometric resolution of the problem of the definite quadrature of the circle).

== Conflicts with the Académie des sciences ==
Vausenville's relationship with the French Academy of Sciences became increasingly strained as he pursued recognition for his mathematical work. Despite being a correspondent of the Academy, his claims regarding circle quadrature were met with skepticism and eventual rejection.

In 1775, the Academy made the significant decision to ban the examination of circle quadrature submissions, partly in response to the flood of amateur attempts, including Vausenville's persistent efforts. The Academy offered a substantial prize of 150,000 livres to anyone who could solve the famous problem, but Vausenville's work was deemed insufficient to merit the award.

Vausenville became increasingly bitter about his treatment by the Academy, particularly their control over censorship that prevented him from publishing his work for several years. Several censors were also Academy members, creating what Vausenville perceived as an institutional conspiracy against his ideas. In a scathing address to Academy members, he wrote:

Is it by oppression and tyranny that you pretend to assist in the progress of human knowledge? Tell me, please, are you the Legislator? Do you possess the authority to enslave genius to your whims, by making reason bend to your opinions? […] What right have you to intellectual knowledge over anyone else?

== Published works ==
- Invention nouvelle. L'art de rayer des Papiers de Musique, Plein & exactement selon les proportions requises pour l'harmonie (1767) - His treatise on music paper ruling
- Consultation sur la quadrature définie du cercle (1774) - His first major work on circle quadrature
- Essai physico-géométrique contenant... (1778) - His comprehensive treatise on circle quadrature, including a special letter to Jean le Rond d'Alembert

== Notable correspondences ==
=== Benjamin Franklin ===
Vausenville maintained correspondence with Benjamin Franklin during the latter's time as American ambassador to France. On June 29, 1779, Vausenville wrote to Franklin, sending him a copy of his Essai physico-géométrique and seeking his opinion on the mathematical work. This correspondence demonstrates Vausenville's efforts to gain international recognition for his mathematical claims beyond the French academic establishment.

=== D'Alembert ===
Vausenville's 1778 Essai physico-géométrique included a specific letter addressed to the prominent mathematician and encyclopedist Jean le Rond d'Alembert, apparently attempting to refute d'Alembert's position on circle quadrature. D'Alembert was one of the leading advocates within the Academy for banning circle quadrature submissions.

== Criticism and controversy ==
The broader context of Vausenville's work was the ongoing 18th-century debate about the quadrature of the circle. The mathematical community was divided between those who sought to educate amateur mathematicians about the problem's impossibility and those, led by d'Alembert, who advocated for simply ignoring such attempts.

Vausenville represented a classic example of what scholars have termed "fringe savants" - individuals who challenged established academic authority through self-publishing and public appeals when rejected by official institutions. His case exemplified the tension between Enlightenment ideals of open inquiry and the practical need for academic institutions to maintain standards.

Although Leonhard Euler and others had already provided strong evidence against the possibility of elementary circle quadrature, and Johann Heinrich Lambert had proven the irrationality of pi in 1768, such mathematical developments had limited immediate impact on persistent amateur attempts.

== Legacy ==
Vausenville's story has become a case study in the sociology of science, illustrating the challenges faced by self-educated individuals seeking recognition from established academic institutions during the Enlightenment. His conflicts with the Academy contributed to broader discussions about scientific authority, censorship, and the democratization of knowledge.

Modern scholars have examined his case as part of the phenomenon of "self-publishing science amateurs" in 18th-century Paris, highlighting how print culture enabled marginalized figures to challenge institutional authority by appealing directly to public opinion.

His work on music paper ruling represents a more practical contribution that preceded his controversial mathematical pursuits, demonstrating his broader technical abilities beyond his disputed geometric claims.

== See also ==
- Squaring the circle
- French Academy of Sciences
- History of pi
- Jean le Rond d'Alembert
- Benjamin Franklin
- Compass-and-straightedge construction
