= Benedetto Scotto =

Italian cartographer and navigator

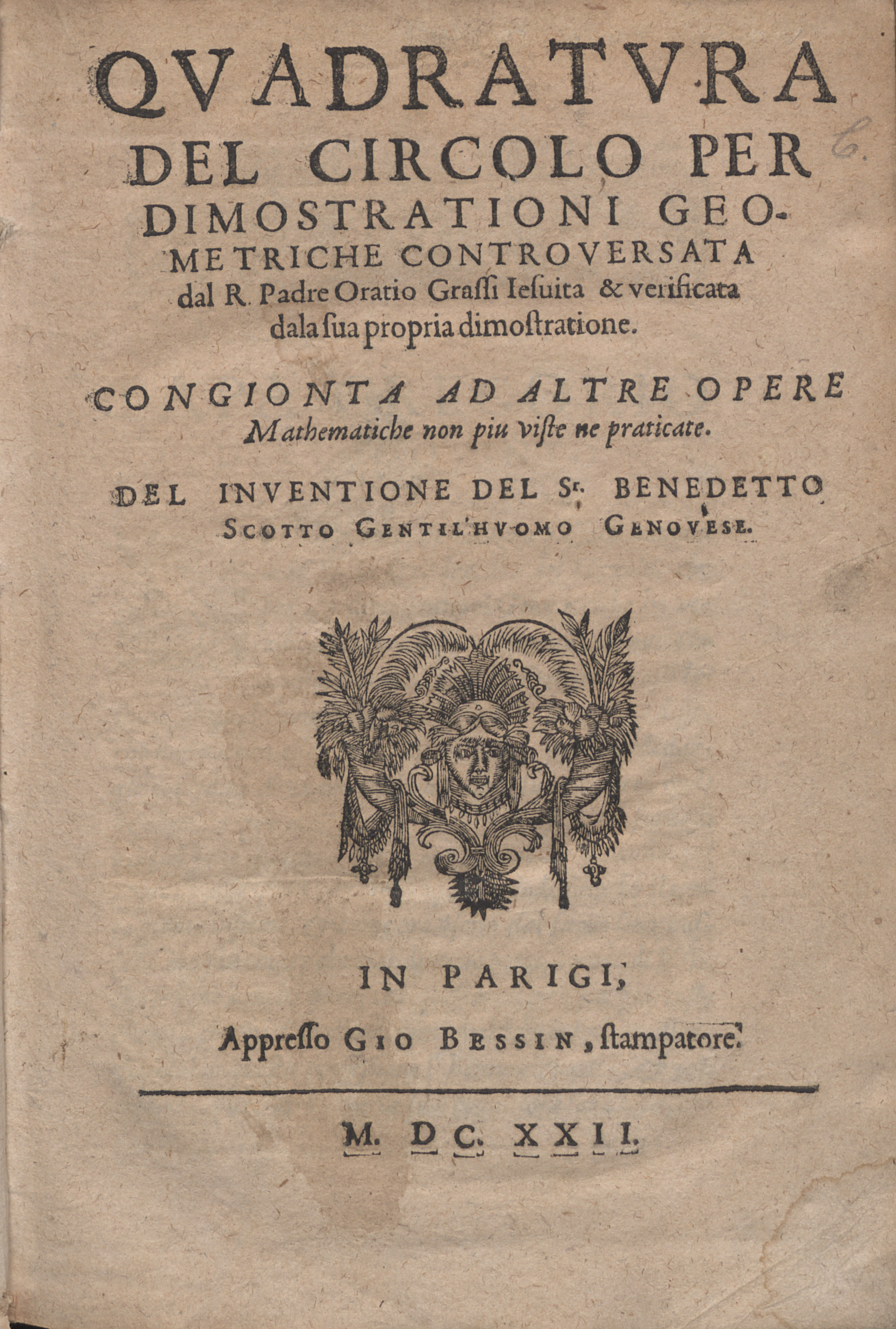
Quadratura del circolo, 1622

Benedetto Scotto (15th century – 16th century) was an Italian cartographer, mathematician and navigator.

Scotto was born in Genoa. He published a treatise in which he proposed to reach the Indies through a crossing to the North in the Arctic Sea.

His works on squaring the circle (1622) and on longitude (1623) were also published in French.

== Works ==
- Scotto, Benedetto (1621). Quadratura del circolo che per quaranta sette dimostrationi geometriche vien verificata (in Italian). Paris: Jean Bessin.
- Scotto, Benedetto (1622). Pseudotetragonismou elegkos, seu Refutatio falsae quadrationis circuli (in Latin). Paris: Jean Moreau.
- Scotto, Benedetto (1622). Quadratura del circolo (in Italian). Paris: Jean Bessin.
