= Auhagen (disambiguation) =

Auhagen is a municipality in Lower Saxony, Germany.

Auhagen may also refer to:

- Auhagen, a rail model accessories manufacturer based in Marienberg, Germany
- Wolfgang Auhagen (born 1953), German musicologist
- Ulrike Auhagen (born 1967), German classical philologist
