= Transcendental equation =

Equation whose side(s) describe a transcendental function

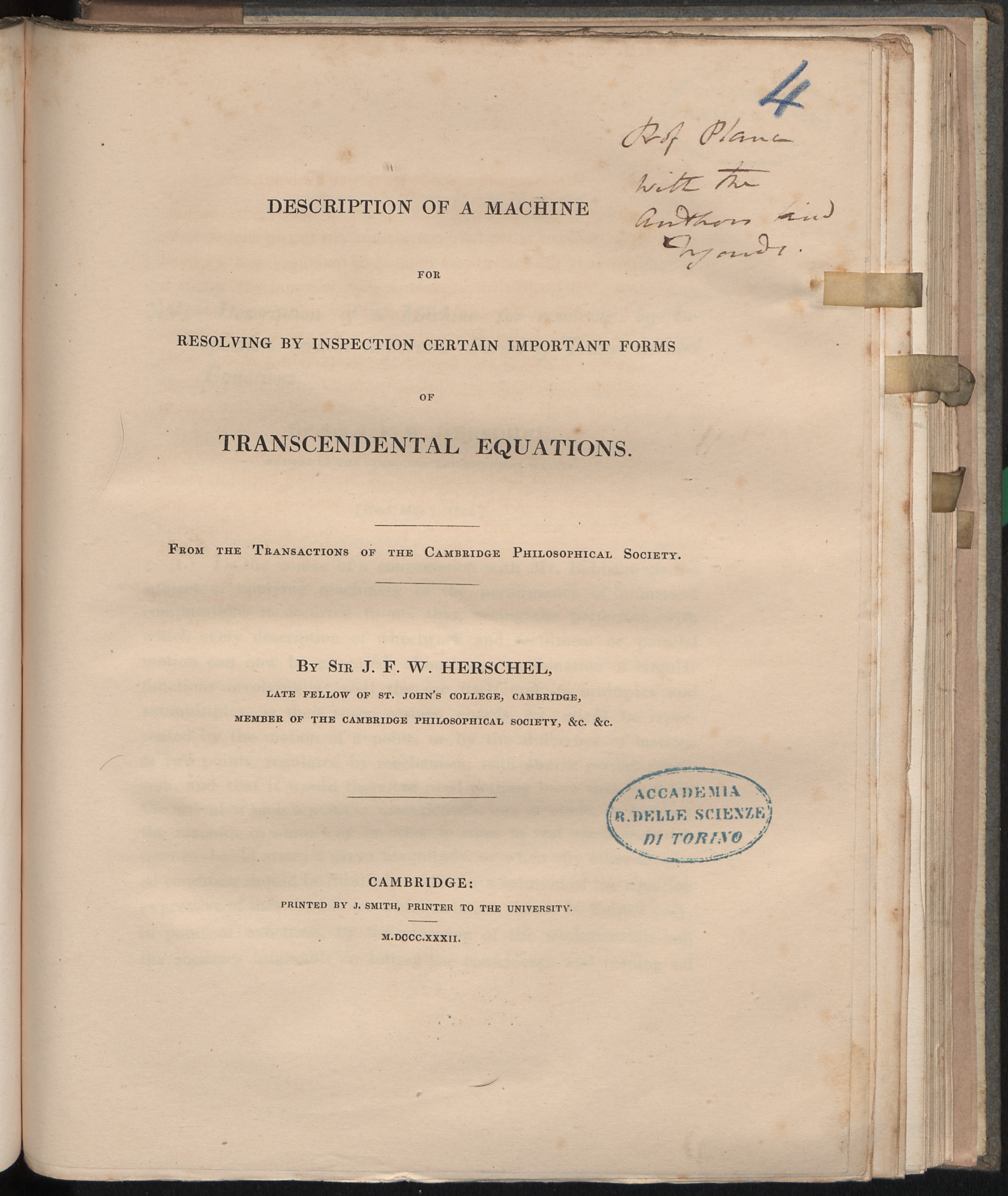
John Herschel, Description of a machine for resolving by inspection certain important forms of transcendental equations, 1832

In applied mathematics, a transcendental equation is an equation over the real (or complex) numbers that is not algebraic, that is, if at least one of its sides describes a transcendental function. Examples include:

$$\begin{align}
x &= e^{-x} \\
x &= \cos x \\
2^x &= x^2
\end{align}$$

A transcendental equation may involve also non-elementary functions, although most published examples do not.

In some cases, a transcendental equation can be solved by transforming it into an equivalent algebraic equation. Some such transformations are sketched below; computer algebra systems may provide more elaborated transformations. (Note: For example, according to the Wolfram Mathematica tutorial page on equation solving, both $2^x = x$ and $e^x + x + 1 = 0$ can be solved by symbolic expressions, while $x = \cos x$ can only be solved approximatively.)

In general, however, only approximate solutions can be found.

== Transformation into an algebraic equation ==
Ad hoc methods exist for some classes of transcendental equations in one variable to transform them into algebraic equations which then might be solved.

=== Exponential equations ===
If the unknown, say x, occurs only in exponents:

- applying the natural logarithm to both sides may yield an algebraic equation, e.g.

$4^x = 3^{x^2-1} \cdot 2^{5x}$ transforms to $x \ln 4 = (x^2-1) \ln 3 + 5x \ln 2$, which simplifies to $x^2 \ln 3 + x(5 \ln 2 - \ln 4) -\ln 3 = 0$, which has the solutions $x = \frac{ -3 \ln 2 \pm \sqrt{9(\ln 2)^2 - 4 (\ln 3)^2} }{ 2 \ln 3 } .$
This will not work if addition occurs "at the base line", as in $4^x = 3^{x^2-1} + 2^{5x} .$

- if all "base constants" can be written as integer or rational powers of some number q, then substituting y=q^{x} may succeed, e.g.

$2^{x-1} + 4^{x-2} - 8^{x-2} = 0$ transforms, using y=2^{x}, to $\frac{1}{2} y + \frac{1}{16} y^2 - \frac{1}{64} y^3 = 0$ which has the solutions $y \in \{ 0, -4, 8\}$, hence $x= \log_2 8 = 3$ is the only real solution.
This will not work if a square or a higher power of x occurs in an exponent, or if the "base constants" do not "share" a common q.

- sometimes, substituting y=xe^{x} may obtain an algebraic equation; after the solutions for y are known, those for x can be obtained by applying the Lambert W function, e.g.:

$x^2e^{2x} + 2 = 3x e^x$ transforms to $y^2 + 2 = 3y,$ which has the solutions $y \in \{1,2\},$ hence $x \in \{ W_0(1), W_0(2), W_{-1}(1), W_{-1}(2) \}$, where $W_0$ and $W_{-1}$ denote the real-valued branches of the multivalued $W$ function.

=== Logarithmic equations ===
If the unknown x occurs only in arguments of a logarithm function:

- applying exponentiation to both sides may yield an algebraic equation, e.g.

$2 \log_5 (3x-1) - \log_5 (12x+1) = 0$ transforms, using exponentiation to base $5$, to $\frac{ (3x-1)^2 }{ 12x+1 } = 1,$ which has the solutions $x \in \{ 0, 2\} .$ If only real numbers are considered, $x = 0$ is not a solution, as it leads to a non-real subexpression $\log_5(-1)$ in the given equation.
This requires the original equation to consist of integer-coefficient linear combinations of logarithms w.r.t. a unique base, and the logarithm arguments to be polynomials in x.

- if all "logarithm calls" have a unique base $b$ and a unique argument expression $f(x),$ then substituting $y = \log_b (f(x))$ may lead to a simpler equation, e.g.

$5 \ln(\sin x^2) + 6 = 7 \sqrt{ \ln(\sin x^2) + 8 }$ transforms, using $y = \ln(\sin x^2) ,$ to $5 y + 6 = 7 \sqrt{ y + 8 },$ which is algebraic and has the single solution $y=\frac{89}{25}$. (Note: Squaring both sides obtains $25y^2+60y+36 = 49 \cdot (y+8)$ which has the additional solution $y=-4$; however, the latter does not solve the unsquared equation.) After that, applying inverse operations to the substitution equation yields $x = \sqrt{ \arcsin \exp y } = \sqrt{ \arcsin \exp \frac{89}{25} }.$

=== Trigonometric equations ===
If the unknown x occurs only as argument of trigonometric functions:

- applying Pythagorean identities and trigonometric sum and multiple formulas, arguments of the forms $\sin(nx+a), \cos(mx+b), \tan(lx+c), ...$ with integer $n,m,l,...$ might all be transformed to arguments of the form, say, $\sin x$. After that, substituting $y = \sin(x)$ yields an algebraic equation, e.g.

$\sin(x+a) = (\cos^2 x) - 1$ transforms to $(\sin x)(\cos a) + \sqrt{ 1 - \sin^2 x }(\sin a) = 1 - (\sin^2 x) - 1$, and, after substitution, to $y (\cos a) + \sqrt{ 1 - y^2 }(\sin a) = - y^2$ which is algebraic (Note: over an appropriate field, containing $\sin a$ and $\cos a$) and can be solved. After that, applying $x = 2k\pi + \arcsin y$ obtains the solutions.

=== Hyperbolic equations ===
If the unknown x occurs only in linear expressions inside arguments of hyperbolic functions,

- unfolding them by their defining exponential expressions and substituting $y = \exp(x)$ yields an algebraic equation, e.g.

$3 \cosh x = 4 + \sinh (2x-6)$ unfolds to $\frac{3}{2} (e^x + \frac{1}{e^x}) = 4 + \frac{1}{2} \left( \frac{(e^x)^2}{e^6} - \frac{e^6}{(e^x)^2} \right) ,$ which transforms to the equation $\frac{3}{2} (y + \frac{1}{y}) = 4 + \frac{1}{2} \left( \frac{y^2}{e^6} - \frac{e^6}{y^2} \right) ,$ which is algebraic (Note: over an appropriate field, containing $e^6$) and can be solved. Applying $x = \ln y$ obtains the solutions of the original equation.

== Approximate solutions ==
Graphical solution of sin(x)=ln(x)

Approximate numerical solutions to transcendental equations can be found using numerical, analytical approximations, or graphical methods.

These equations can be solved by direct iteration by reordering the equation into the form $x=f(x)$ and making an initial guess $x_0$, computing $f(x)$ which becomes $x_1$ and substituting it back into $f(x)$, etc. Convergence may be very slow. Some reorderings may diverge, so some other reordering that converges must be found. $f(x)$ must be continuous and "sufficiently smooth" or the method may fail.

Numerical methods for solving arbitrary equations are called root-finding algorithms. By rearranging the equation into the form $f(x)=0$, if $f(x)$ is continuous and differentiable, Newton's method involving taking the derivative of $f(x)$, is a common iterative method of approximating a root; an initial guess $x_0$ must be "sufficiently close" to the root of interest to converge to it.

In some cases, the equation can be well approximated using Taylor series near the zero. For example, for $k \approx 1$, the solutions of $\sin x = k x$ are approximately those of $(1-k) x - x^3/6=0$, namely $x=0$ and $x = \plusmn \sqrt{6} \sqrt{1-k}$.

For a graphical solution, one method is to set each side of a single-variable transcendental equation equal to a dependent variable and plot the two graphs, using their intersecting points to find solutions (see picture).

== Other solutions ==
- Some transcendental systems of high-order equations can be solved by “separation” of the unknowns, reducing them to algebraic equations.
- The following can also be used when solving transcendental equations/inequalities: If $x_0$ is a solution to the equation $f(x)=g(x)$ and $f(x)\leq c\leq g(x)$, then this solution must satisfy $f(x_0)=g(x_0)=c$. For example, we want to solve $\log_{2}\left(3+2x-x^{2}\right)=\tan^{2}\left(\frac{\pi x}{4}\right)+\cot^{2}\left(\frac{\pi x}{4}\right)$. The given equation is defined for $-1<x<3$. Let $f(x)=\log_{2}\left(3+2x-x^{2}\right)$ and $g(x)=\tan^{2}\left(\frac{\pi x}{4}\right)+\cot^{2}\left(\frac{\pi x}{4}\right)$. It is easy to show that $f(x)\leq 2$ and $g(x)\geq 2$ so if there is a solution to the equation, it must satisfy $f(x)=g(x)=2$. From $f(x)=2$ we get $x=1\in(-1,3)$. Indeed, $f(1)=g(1)=2$ and so $x=1$ is the only real solution to the equation.

== See also ==
- Mrs. Miniver's problem – Problem on areas of intersecting circles
- Goat grazing problem - another problem on areas of intersecting circles
