= Lune of Hippocrates =

Geometric construction

The lune of Hippocrates is the upper left shaded area. It has the same area as the lower right shaded triangle.

In geometry, the lune of Hippocrates, named after Hippocrates of Chios, is a lune bounded by arcs of two circles, the smaller of which has as its diameter a chord spanning a right angle on the larger circle. Equivalently, it is a non-convex plane region bounded by one 180-degree circular arc and one 90-degree circular arc. It is the first curvilinear figure that has been squared—that is, for which a square of equal area has been constructed using only a straightedge and compass.

== History ==
Hippocrates wanted to solve the classic problem of squaring the circle, i.e., constructing a square by means of straightedge and compass, having the same area as a given circle. He proved that the lune bounded by the arcs labeled E and F in the figure has the same area as triangle ABO. He also squared a composition of a lune (or lunes) and a (semi)circle.

This afforded some hope of solving the problem of squaring the circle: if a composition of a circle and a lune were squared, then the squaring of the lune would imply the squaring of the circle. (N.B. Hippocrates did not square the lune which is squarable in combination with a circle.) Also, the very fact that a curved figure could be squared served as a counterexample to the claim that such a quadrature is impossible on the grounds that linear and curvilinear figures differ in kind.

The key observation in the demonstration is that the areas of circles and circular segments are proportional to the squares of their diameters. Heath concludes Hippocrates proved this, while Mueller claims that Hippocrates probably assumed it without proof.

Hippocrates' book, which contained this result together with the quadrature of two other lunes and of a circle combined with a lune, has been lost. But the content of the book was preserved through the History of Geometry compiled by Eudemus of Rhodes, which has itself not survived but is known through the excerpts preserved by Simplicius of Cilicia in his commentary on Aristotle's Physics. Alexander of Aphrodisias also reported another proof of the quadrature of Hippocrates' lune, as well as of a composition of a semicircle together with three lunes, and this too is preserved in Simplicius' text. In this article we mainly follow Alexander's shorter account, though Eudemus' version, which adopts a somewhat different line of argument, is often regarded as preserving a more original form.

Not until 1882, with Ferdinand von Lindemann's proof of the transcendence of π, was squaring the circle proved to be impossible.

== Proof ==
Hippocrates' result can be proved as follows (the following proof is based on the Alexander's version): The center of the circle on which the arc AEB lies is the point D, which is the midpoint of the hypotenuse of the isosceles right triangle ABO. Therefore, the diameter AC of the larger circle ABC is $\sqrt{2}$ times the diameter of the smaller circle on which the arc AEB lies. Consequently, the smaller circle has half the area of the larger circle, and therefore the quarter circle AFBOA is equal in area to the semicircle AEBDA. Subtracting the crescent-shaped area AFBDA from the quarter circle gives triangle ABO and subtracting the same crescent from the semicircle gives the lune. Since the triangle and lune are both formed by subtracting equal areas from equal area, they are themselves equal in area.

== Generalizations ==
The lunes of Alhazen. The two blue lunes together have the same area as the green right triangle.

Using a similar proof to the one above, the Arab mathematician Hasan Ibn al-Haytham (Latinized name Alhazen, c. 965 – c. 1040) showed that where two lunes are formed, on the two sides of a right triangle, whose outer boundaries are semicircles and whose inner boundaries are formed by the circumcircle of the triangle, then the areas of these two lunes added together are equal to the area of the triangle. The lunes formed in this way from a right triangle are known as the lunes of Alhazen. Ibn al-Haytham not only employed this theorem in his proof of the quadrature of Hippocrates’ lune, but also used it to establish various theorems concerning the areas of lunes. He wrote three treatises on lunes, the first two of which are motivated by the problem of squaring the circle. The last one, however—composed somewhat later—abandons this perspective and instead pursues the theory of the quadrature of lunes in its own right.

Any lune that is squarable and constructable by compass and straight-edge can be specified by the two angles formed by the inner and outer arcs on their respective circles; in this notation, for instance, the lune of Hippocrates would have the inner and outer angles (90°, 180°) with ratio 1:2. Hippocrates found two other squarable concave lunes, with angles approximately (107.2°, 160.9°) with ratio 2:3 and (68.5°, 205.6°) with ratio 1:3. Two more squarable concave lunes, with angles approximately (46.9°, 234.4°) with ratio 1:5 and (100.8°, 168.0°) with ratio 3:5 were found in 1766 by Martin Johan Wallenius and again in 1771 by Euler, in 1840 by Thomas Clausen. In the mid-20th century, two Russian mathematicians, Nikolai Chebotaryov and his student Anatoly Dorodnov, completely classified the lunes that are constructible by compass and straightedge and that have equal area to a given square. As Chebotaryov and Dorodnov showed, these five pairs of angles give the only constructible squarable lunes; in particular, there are no other constructible squarable lunes.
