= Adam Adamandy Kochański =

Polish mathematician (1631–1700)

Adam Adamandy Kochański IPA: [ˈadam adaˈmandɨ kɔˈxaj̃ski] (5 August 1631 – 17 May 1700) was a Polish mathematician, physicist, clock-maker, pedagogue and librarian. He was the Court Mathematician of John III Sobieski.

Kochański was born in Dobrzyń nad Wisłą. He began his education in Toruń, and in 1652 he entered the Society of Jesus in Vilnius. He studied philosophy at Vilnius University (then called Vilnius Academy). He also studied mathematics, physics and theology. He went on to lecture on those subjects at several European universities: in Florence, Prague, Olomouc, Wrocław, Mainz and Würzburg. In 1680 he accepted an offer from John III Sobieski, the king of Poland, returning to Poland and taking the position of the king's chaplain, mathematician, clock maker, librarian, and tutor of the king's son, Jakub.

He wrote many scientific papers, mainly on mathematics and mechanics, but also on physics, astronomy and philosophy. The best known of his works, Observationes Cyclometricae ad facilitandam Praxin accommodatae, is devoted to the squaring the circle (or alternatively, the quadrature of the circle) and was published in 1685 in the leading scientific periodical of the time, Acta Eruditorum. He also found a famous approximation of π today called Kochański's approximation:

$$\sqrt{{40 \over 3} - 2 \sqrt{3}\  } = 3.14153333870509461863 \dots$$

In 1686, Kochański introduced a new type of magic square called quadrata subtractionis (subtraction magic squares), in which the numbers in each row, column, and diagonal are sorted in descending order before alternating addition and subtraction to obtain a constant value.

Kochański cooperated and corresponded with many scientists, Johannes Hevelius and Gottfried Leibniz among them. He was apparently the only one of the contemporary Poles to know elements of the newly invented calculus. As a mechanic he was a renowned clock maker. He suggested replacing the clock's pendulum with a spring, and standardizing the number of escapements per hour.

He died in Teplice in Bohemia.
