= Eudemus of Rhodes =

First historian of science, prominent pupil of Aristotle

Eudemus
- Εὔδημος
- Born: Rhodes
- Died: c. 300 BC

Eudemus of Rhodes (Ancient Greek: Εὔδημος; flourished before 300 BC) was an ancient Greek philosopher, considered the first historian of science. He was one of Aristotle's most important pupils, editing his teacher's work and making it more easily accessible. Eudemus' nephew, Pasicles, was also credited with editing Aristotle's works.

== Life ==
Eudemus was born on the isle of Rhodes, but spent a large part of his life in Athens, where he studied philosophy at Aristotle's Peripatetic School. Eudemus's collaboration with Aristotle was long-lasting and close, and he was generally considered to be one of Aristotle's most brilliant pupils: he and Theophrastus of Lesbos were regularly called not Aristotle's "disciples", but his "companions" (ἑταῖροι).

It seems that Theophrastus was the greater genius of the two, continuing Aristotle's studies in a wide range of areas. Although Eudemus too conducted original research, his forte lay in systematizing Aristotle's philosophical legacy, and in a clever didactical presentation of his teacher's ideas. Later authors who wrote commentaries on Aristotle often made good use of Eudemus's preliminary work. It is for this reason that, though Eudemus's writings themselves are not extant, we know many citations and testimonia regarding his work, and are thus able to build up a picture of him and his work.

Aristotle, shortly before his death in 322 BC, designated Theophrastus to be his successor as head of the Peripatetic School. Eudemus then returned to Rhodes, where he founded his own philosophical school, continued his own philosophical research, and went on editing Aristotle's work.

== Historian of science ==
At the insistence of Aristotle, Eudemus wrote histories of Greek mathematics and astronomy. Though only fragments of these have survived, included in the works of later authors, their value is immense. It is only because later authors used Eudemus's writings that we still are informed about the early history and development of Greek science. In his historical writings, Eudemus showed how the purely practically oriented knowledge and skills that earlier peoples such as the Egyptians and the Babylonians had known, were by the Greeks given a theoretical basis, and built into a coherent and comprehensive philosophical building.

- As regards his History of Arithmetics (Άριθμητικὴ ἱστορία) we only have the tiniest bit of information: there is only one testimonium, saying that Eudemus mentions the discovery by the Pythagoreans that it is possible to connect musical intervals with integer numbers.
- Eudemus's History of Geometry (Γεωμετρικὴ ἱστορία) is mentioned by many more writers, including Proclus, Simplicius, and Pappus of Alexandria. From them we know that the book treated the work by, among others, Thales of Miletus, the Pythagoreans, Oenopides of Chios, and Hippocrates of Chios. Among the topics Eudemus discussed were the discovery of geometrical theorems and constructions (systematized in Eudemus's days by Euclid in his Elements), and the classical problems of Greek geometry, such as the quadrature of the circle and the duplication of the cube.
- We know much about Eudemus's History of Astronomy (Άστρολογικὴ ἱστορία), from sources such as Theon of Smyrna, Simplicius, Diogenes Laërtius, Clement of Alexandria, and others. Building upon those data we can reconstruct with some accuracy the astronomical discoveries that were made in Greece between 600 and 350 BC, as well as the theories that were developed in that period regarding the earth, solar and lunar eclipses, the movements of the heavenly bodies, et cetera. Philosophers and astronomers treated by Eudemus include Thales, Anaximander, Anaximenes, Oenopides, Eudoxus, and others.

Two other historical works are attributed to Eudemus, but here his authorship is not certain. First, he is said to have written a History of Theology, that discussed the Babylonian, Egyptian, and Greek ideas regarding the origins of the universe. Secondly, he is said to have been the author of a History of Lindos (Lindos is a town on the Greek island of Rhodes)

To Eudemus is also ascribed a book with miraculous stories about animals and their human-like properties (exemplary braveness, ethical sensitivity, and the like). However, as the character of this work does not at all fit in with the serious scientific approach that is apparent from Eudemus's other works, it is generally held that Eudemus of Rhodes cannot have been the author of this book (it may have been another Eudemus — his was a fairly common name in ancient Greece).

== Editor of Aristotle's work ==
Eudemus, Theophrastus, and other pupils of Aristotle took care that the intellectual heritage of their master after his death would remain accessible in a reliable form, by recording it in a long series of publications. These were based on Aristotle's writings, their own lecture notes, personal recollections, et cetera.

Thus one of Aristotle's writings is still called the Eudemian Ethics, probably because it was Eudemus who edited (though very lightly) this text. More important, Eudemus wrote a number of influential books that clarified Aristotle's works:

- Eudemus's Physics (Φυσικά) was a compact, and more didactical version of Aristotle's homonymous work.
- Eudemus wrote two or three books dealing with logics (Analytics and Categories (possibly the same book), and On Discourse (Περι λεξεως)), which probably expounded Aristotle's ideas.
- Finally, a geometrical work, On the Angle (Περὶ γωνίας).

A comparison between the Eudemus fragments and their corresponding parts in the works of Aristotle shows that Eudemus was a gifted teacher: he systematizes subject matter, leaves out digressions that distract from the main theme, adds specific examples to illustrate abstract statements, formulates in catching phrases, and occasionally inserts a joke to keep the reader attentive.
