= Juan Carlos Bersague =

- Juan Carlos Bersague in 2006

Background information
- Born: 20 October 1963 (age 62)
- Origin: Cuba
- Genres: Choral Music, Sacred music, Classical music.
- Occupations: Choral conductor, Academy Professor in Venezuela
- Instrument: Conductor
- Years active: 1985 - present

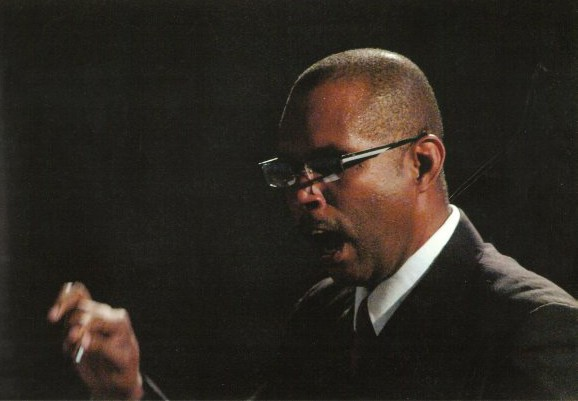

Juan Carlos Bersague Chacón is a Choral Conductor and Conducting Professor in Venezuela, born in Havana, Cuba in 1963.

In the present time he is the Titular Conductor of the Venezuelan vocal group Cantat Vocal.

== Biography ==
He earned a degree in Choral Conducting at the Escuela Nacional de Instructores de Arte (National Academy of Arts Instructors) and at the Centro Nacional de la Enseñanza Artística (National Center for Artistic Teaching), both in Havana, with Mtros. Mayda Martínez and María Felicia Pérez.

He was one of the founder members of the famous Cuban chamber choir EXAUDI, conducted by his professor María Felicia Pérez. With EXAUDI, he performed in Belgium, Bulgaria, Canada, Denmark, France, Germany, Hungary, Italy, Spain, Sweden, and Venezuela.

In Venezuela, Mtro. Bersague conducted Niños Cantores del Zulia Children's Choir from 1994 to 2005, Coral Antiphona Chamber Choir from 1995 to 2008, Cantat Vocal Chamber Choir from 2009 to 2017. He was appointed to manage the Vocal Area at the Arts and Music's Faculty of the Universidad Católica Cecilio Acosta, in Maracaibo. Moreover, he taught Choral Conducting at the Arts's Experimental Faculty [FEDA] of the Universidad del Zulia, and he conducts the Academical Choir at the Conservatory of Music "José Luis Paz" in Maracaibo, where he also taught Choral Practice since 1997.

In the beginning of 2009, Juan Carlos Bersague founded Cantat Vocal Chamber Choir. From that moment on Mtro. Bersague works as its Titular Conductor.

Mtro. Bersague was also the Titular Conductor for the Western part or the country of the Symphonic Choir of the National System of Youth and Children's Orchestras of Venezuela [FESNOJIV, in Spanish], better known as El Sistema. Currently he is the Titular conductor of Youth Choir of the Symphony of Peru.

== Exaudi Chamber Choir ==
Conducted by Maestra Maria Felicia Pérez, and as a founder member of the Cuban EXAUDI Chamber Choir, he participated and obtained several prizes in the following Choral Competitions:

- XIV "Béla Bartók" International Choral Competition / Bartók Béla Nemzetkösi Kórusverseny / Debrecen, Hungary 1990. [First prize in the Category of Chamber Choirs and Prize in the Category of Folkloric Program]
- XXIV Certamen Internacional de Masas Corales / Tolosa, Euskadi-Spain 1992. [Third prize in Polyphony]
- XXV Certamen Internacional de Masas Corales / Tolosa, Euskadi-Spain 1993. [First prize in Folklore Category, access to the European Gran Prix 1993 and The Audience Prize]
- III International Chamber Choir Competition Marktoberdorf, Germany, 1993. [Third prize in the Internationally Excellent Category]
- Choral "Harmonie 93" / Lindenholzhausen, Germany 1993. [First prize]
- European Grand Prix for Choral Singing 1993 / Varna, Bulgaria 1993.

== Coral Antiphona ==
Since 1995 until October 2008, Juan Carlos Bersague worked full-time as the Titular Conductor of the Venezuelan Coral Antiphona Chamber Choir, participating and obtaining several prices in choral festivals and competitions in Venezuela and abroad.

Festivals as:

- V Festival Internacional de Coros de Santiago de Cuba / Santiago de Cuba, Cuba 1999.
- II Festival de Coros Maracaibo un canto a Vos / Maracaibo, Venezuela 2001.
- XX Aniversario del Festival de Coros de Álava / Vitoria-Gasteiz, Spain 2001.
- I Festival Mundial de Coros de Puebla / Puebla, Mexico 2002.
- VII Festival Internacional D´Canto / Margarita Island, Venezuela 2004. [Prize of the audience].
- III Festival de Coros de Cámara Cantarte / Caracas, Venezuela 2004.

And competitions as:

- I Concurso de Coros "Luis Soto Villalobos" / Maracaibo, Venezuela 1999. [First Prize]
- III Competencia de Coros de Mérida / Mérida, Venezuela 2002. [First Prize in Polyphony & Second Prize in Folklore].
- XXXVII Certamen Internacional de Masas Corales / Tolosa, Spain 2005.
- XXIV Festival-Certamen Internacional de Música de Cantonigròs / Cantonigròs, Spain. 2006. [First Prize in the Mixed Choirs's category & First Prize in the Popular Music's category].
- LII International Habaneras and Polyphony Contest of Torrevieja / Torrevieja, Spain 2006. [Third Prize in Habaneras and "Francisco Vallejos" Prize, for the best interpretation of a popular habanera].
- LV Concorso Polifonico Internazionale Guido d'Arezzo / Arezzo, Italy 2007. [Third Prize in the Polyphony Category].

Coro de Cámara Cantat Vocal [editar]

== Chamber Choir Cantat Vocal ==
V Festival Un Canto en Pascua. / Maracaibo, Estado Zulia, Venezuela 2009 [Prize for the best performance]

Festival “Canticum Novum” Caracas, Distrito Capital, Venezuela 2010

VII Festival Regional de Coros y Grupos Polifónicos “Un canto al Bicentenario” Barquisimeto, Estado Lara, Venezuela 2010

VI Festival Un Canto en Pascua. / Maracaibo, Estado Zulia, Venezuela 2010 [Prize for the best performance]

I Encuentro Coral de Música Sacra "Vox Clamantis.Maracaibo, Estado Zulia, Venezuela 2010

VII Festival Un Canto en Pascua. / Maracaibo, Estado Zulia, Venezuela 2011 [Prize for the best performance]

II Encuentro Coral de Música Sacra "Vox Clamantis.Maracaibo, Estado Zulia, Venezuela 2011

I Concurso Internacional de Coros AMERIDE. San Lorenzo, Estado de Minas Gerais, Brasil 2011

VIII Festival Un Canto en Pascua. / Maracaibo, Estado Zulia, Venezuela 2012 [Prize for the best performancen]

XI Festival Un Canto en Pascua. / Maracaibo, Estado Zulia, Venezuela 2013. [Prize for the performancen]

In April 2012 he was honored by the Coral Group Venezziola (Maracaibo, Venezuela) in the VIII Festival A Song At Easter and IV National Edition for its extensive and outstanding musical career.

== Sinfonía por el Perú ==
In 2018, Bersague traveled to Lima-Perú, and started to conduct the youth choir of Sinfonía por el Perú, a social foundation founded by the renowned tenor Juan Diego Flórez (2011).

Since then, and led by Bersague, youth choir of Sinfonía por el Perú has overcome different musical and social challenges that have resulted in trips to different countries in order to share their music and their human thoughts about how music could improve our selves.

For example,

- "Lucerna Festival". Suiza (2019).

- "Tour Chile 2023". Chile (2023).

- "Festival Summa Cum Laude". Austria (2024). Winning the first prize in category "mixed choir".

- "The promise of music". Canada (2025).

- "Certamen Internacional de Habaneras y Polifonía de Torrevieja" (Alicante, Spain)

Bersague and the youth choir of Sinfonía por el Perú are starting to build an organization that is gaining international recognition for musical quality.
