= Carl Theodore Heisel =

Pseudo-mathematician (1852–1937)

Carl Theodore Heisel (1852–1937) was a mathematical crank who wrote several books in the 1930s challenging accepted mathematical truths. Among his claims is that he found a way to square the circle. He is credited with 24 works in 62 publications. Heisel did not charge money for his books; he gave thousands of them away for free. Because of this, they are available at many libraries and universities. Heisel's books have historic and monetary value. Paul Halmos referred to one of Heisel's works (a book claiming to have accomplished the impossible task of squaring the circle) as a "classic crank book."

== Selected works ==
- Heisel, Carl Theodore (1934). Mathematical and geometrical demonstrations, disproving numerous theorems, problems, postulates, corolleries, axioms naturally growing out of the extraordinary discoveries of a lacking link (2d. ed.). Cleveland.
