= Antiphona =

Venezuelan mixed choir

Coral Antiphona
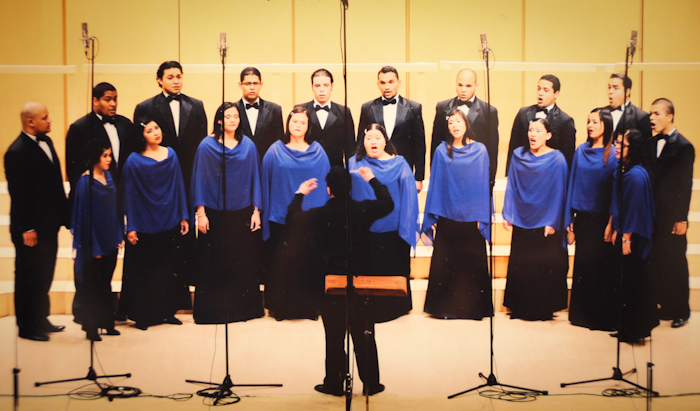
- Coral Antiphona at Béla Bartók International Choir Competition (Hungary)

Background information
- Origin: Maracaibo, Venezuela
- Genres: Classical, Latin American
- Years active: 1995–present
- Members: List of current members
- Website: http://www.facebook.com/#!/pages/Coral-Antiphona/46603881191

Antiphona was a Venezuelan mixed choir, constituted by 24 singers. From the moment of its foundation, Antiphona was promoted in Latin American and European scenarios the choral repertoire of all times, particularly working on contemporary choral music.

Antiphona Titular Conductor was Mtro. César Alejandro Carrillo

== Biography ==
Coral Antiphona was created in 1995 by Mtro. Juan Belmonte, former conductor of the Orquesta Sinfónica del Zulia, in Venezuela, with the purpose of having a stable group for the symphonic choral repertoire. For some time, Antiphona acted as a nonprofit civil association of culture promotion. The choir was conducted by Mtro. Juan Carlos Bersague from 1995 to 2008. From 2010 and on, Antiphona Titular Conductor was Mtro. César Alejandro Carrillo.

In its curricular path, Antiphona performed in several scenarios in Bulgaria, Colombia, Cuba, France, Hungary, Italy, Mexico, Spain and Venezuela.

== Festivals and competitions ==
From a curricular point of view, Antiphona has participated in the following choir festivals and competitions.

Festivals:

- V Festival Internacional de Coros de Santiago de Cuba / Santiago de Cuba, Cuba 1999.
- II Festival de Coros Maracaibo un canto a Vos / Maracaibo, Venezuela 2001.
- XX Aniversario del Festival de Coros de Álava / Vitoria-Gasteiz, Spain 2001.
- I Festival Mundial de Coros de Puebla / Puebla, Mexico 2002.
- VII Festival Internacional D´Canto / Isla de Margarita, Venezuela 2004. [Prize of the audience].
- III Festival de Coros de Cámara Cantarte / Caracas, Venezuela 2004.

Competitions:

- I Concurso de Coros "Luis Soto Villalobos" / Maracaibo, Venezuela 1999. [First Prize]
- III Competencia de Coros de Mérida / Mérida, Venezuela 2002. [First Prize in Polyphony & Second Prize in Folklore categories].
- XXXVII Certamen Internacional de Masas Corales / Tolosa, Spain 2005.
- XXIV Festival-Certamen Internacional de Música de Cantonigròs / Cantonigròs, Spain. 2006. [First Prize in the Mixed Choirs Category & First Prize in the Popular Music Category].
- LII International Habaneras and Polyphony Contest / Torrevieja, Spain 2006. [Third Prize in Habaneras Category & "Francisco Vallejos" Prize, for the best interpretation of a popular habanera].
- LV Concorso Polifonico Internazionale Guido d'Arezzo / Arezzo, Italy 2007. [Third Prize in the Polyphony Category].
- XXXVII Florilège Vocal de Tours / Tours, France 2008.
- XXXI Международен майски хоров конкурс "Проф. Г. Димитров" (International May Choir Competition Prof. G. Dimitrov) / Varna, Bulgaria 2009. [Third Prize in Chamber Choirs Category].
- XXIV Bartók Béla Nemzetközi Kórusverseny (Béla Bartók International Choir Competition) / Debrecen, Hungary 2010. [Third Prize in Chamber Choirs Category].

== Current members ==
Soprani 1

- Johanna Chacín
- Valeria Pire
- Florannedig Ortiz

Soprani 2

- Zhara Flaviani
- Daniela Gonzalez
- Sara Gonzalez

Alti 1

- Lourdes Franco
- Maria Isabel Salas
- Khiara Flaviani

Alti 2

- Migdali Herrison
- Danybel Villamizar
- Estefania Lopez

Tenori 1

- Alexis Garrido
- Keinel Aparicio
- Andrés Montilla

Tenori 2

- Hender Paz
- Deivis Herrera

Baritoni

- Hender García
- Daniel Villamizar
- Juan Diego Pire

Bassi

- Guillermo Nava
- Neldenis Montiel
- Javier Briceño

Instruments

- Héctor Eduardo Silva (Cuatro)
- Maestro César Alejandro Carrillo
