= Mrs. Miniver's problem =

Problem on areas of intersecting circles

Three instances of Mrs. Miniver's problem. In each case the inner yellow area equals the total area of the surrounding blue regions. The left case shows two circles of equal areas, the right case shows one circle with twice the area of the other, and the middle case is intermediate between these two.

Mrs. Miniver's problem is a geometry problem about the area of circles. It asks how to place two circles $A$ and $B$ of given radii in such a way that the lens formed by intersecting their two interiors has equal area to the symmetric difference of $A$ and $B$ (the area contained in any one but not both circles). It was named for an analogy between geometry and social dynamics enunciated by fictional character Mrs. Miniver, who "saw every relationship as a pair of intersecting circles". Its solution involves a transcendental equation.

== Origin ==
The problem derives from "A Country House Visit", one of Jan Struther's newspaper articles appearing in the Times of London between 1937 and 1939 featuring her character Mrs. Miniver. According to the story:

She saw every relationship as a pair of intersecting circles. It would seem at first glance that the more they overlapped the better the relationship; but this is not so. Beyond a certain point the law of diminishing returns sets in, and there are not enough private resources left on either side to enrich the life that is shared. Probably perfection is reached when the area of the two outer crescents, added together, is exactly equal to that of the leaf-shaped piece in the middle. On paper there must be some neat mathematical formula for arriving at this; in life, none.

Louis A. Graham and Clifton Fadiman formalized the mathematics of the problem and popularized it among recreational mathematicians.

== Solution ==
The problem can be solved by cutting the lune along the line segment between the two crossing points of the circles, into two circular segments, and using the formula for the area of a circular segment to relate the distance between the crossing points to the total area that the problem requires the lune to have. This gives a transcendental equation for the distance between crossing points but it can be solved numerically. There are two boundary conditions whose distances between centers can be readily solved: the farthest apart the centers can be is when the circles have equal radii, and the closest they can be is when one circle is contained completely within the other, which happens when the ratio between radii is $\sqrt2$. If the ratio of radii falls beyond these limiting cases, the circles cannot satisfy the problem's area constraint.

In the case of two circles of equal size, these equations can be simplified somewhat. The rhombus formed by the two circle centers and the two crossing points, with side lengths equal to the radius, has an angle $\theta\approx 2.605$ radians at the circle centers, found by solving the equation
$$\theta-\sin\theta=\frac{2\pi}{3},$$
from which it follows that the ratio of the distance between their centers to their radius is $2\cos\tfrac\theta2\approx0.529864$.

== See also ==
- Goat grazing problem § Interior grazing problem, another problem of equalizing the areas of circular lunes and lenses
