= Antiphon (writer) =

Ancient Greek biographer

Antiphon (Ancient Greek: Ἀντιφῶν) was an author of ancient Greece, who wrote an account of men distinguished for virtue (περὶ τῶν ἐν ἀρετή πρωτευσάντων), one of whom was Pythagoras.
