= Goat grazing problem =

Recreational mathematics planar boundary and area problem

The goat grazing problem is either of two related problems in recreational mathematics involving a tethered goat grazing a circular area: the interior grazing problem and the exterior grazing problem. The former involves grazing the interior of a circular area, and the latter, grazing an exterior of a circular area. For the exterior problem, the constraint that the rope can not enter the circular area dictates that the grazing area forms an involute. If the goat were instead tethered to a post on the edge of a circular path of pavement that did not obstruct the goat (rather than a fence or a silo), the interior and exterior problem would be complements of a simple circular area.

The original problem was the exterior grazing problem and appeared in the 1748 edition of the English annual journal The Ladies' Diary: or, the Woman's Almanack, designated as Question CCCIII attributed to Upnorensis (an unknown historical figure), stated thus:

Observing a horse tied to feed in a gentlemen's park, with one end of a rope to his fore foot, and the other end to one of the circular iron rails, enclosing a pond, the circumference of which rails being 160 yards, equal to the length of the rope, what quantity of ground at most, could the horse feed?

The related problem involving area in the interior of a circle without reference to barnyard animals first appeared in 1894 in the first edition of the renown journal American Mathematical Monthly. Attributed to Charles E. Myers, it was stated as:

A circle containing one acre is cut by another whose center is on the circumference of the given circle, and the area common to both is one-half acre. Find the radius of the cutting circle.

The solutions in both cases are non-trivial but yield to straightforward application of trigonometry, analytical geometry or integral calculus. Both problems are intrinsically transcendental – they do not have closed-form analytical solutions in the Euclidean plane. The numerical answers must be obtained by an iterative approximation procedure. The goat problems do not yield any new mathematical insights; rather they are primarily exercises in how to artfully deconstruct problems in order to facilitate solution.

Three-dimensional analogues and planar boundary/area problems on other shapes, including the obvious rectangular barn and/or field, have been proposed and solved. A generalized solution for any smooth convex curve like an ellipse, and even unclosed curves, has been formulated.

== Exterior grazing problem ==
Goat tethered to silo at v, grazing an area under an involute

The question about the grazable area outside a circle is considered. This concerns a situation where the animal is tethered to a silo. The complication here is that the grazing area overlaps around the silo (i.e., in general, the tether is longer than one half the circumference of the silo): the goat can only eat the grass once, he can't eat it twice. The answer to the problem as proposed was given in the 1749 issue of the magazine by a Mr. Heath, and stated as 76,257.86 sq.yds. which was arrived at partly by "trial and a table of logarithms". The answer is not so accurate as the number of digits of precision would suggest. No analytical solution was provided.

=== A useful approximation ===
Let tether length R = 160 yds. and silo radius r = R/(2π) yds. The involute in the fourth quadrant is a nearly circular arc. One can imagine a circular segment with the same perimeter (arc length) would enclose nearly the same area; the radius and therefore the area of that segment could be readily computed. The arc length of an involute is given by $\tfrac{1}{2}r\theta^2$ so the arc length |FG| of the involute in the fourth quadrant is $\tfrac{1}{2} r\Big[\theta^2\Big]^{2\pi}_{\tfrac{3\pi}{2}-\varphi}$. Let c be the length of an arc segment of the involute between the y-axis and a vertical line tangent to the silo at θ = 3π/2; it is the arc subtended by Φ. $c\approx r$ (while the arc is minutely longer than r, the difference is negligible). So $|FG|=\tfrac{1}{2}\cdot 25.46\cdot(6.28^2-4.71^2)+25.46=245.38$. The arc length of a circular arc is $r\theta$ and θ here is π/2 radians of the fourth quadrant, so $r\tfrac{\pi}{2}=245.38$, r the radius of the circular arc is $156.21$ and the area of the circular segment bounded by it is $\tfrac{\pi r^2}{4}=19165$. The area of the involute excludes half the area of the silo (1018.61) in the fourth quadrant, so its approximate area is 18146, and the grazable area including the half circle of radius R, ($\tfrac{1}{2}\pi R^2$) totals $2\cdot 18146+40212=76505$. That is 249 sq.yds. greater than the correct area of 76256, an error of just 0.33%. This method of approximating may not be quite so good for angles < 3π/2 of the involute.

=== Solution by integrating with polar coordinates ===
Find the area between a circle and its involute over an angle of 2π to −2π excluding any overlap. In Cartesian coordinates, the equation of the involute is transcendental; doing a line integral there is hardly feasible. A more felicitous approach is to use polar coordinates (z,θ). Because the "sweep" of the area under the involute is bounded by a tangent line (see diagram and derivation below) which is not the boundary ($\overline {qF}$) between overlapping areas, the decomposition of the problem results in four computable areas: a half circle whose radius is the tether length (A_{1}); the area "swept" by the tether over an angle of 2π (A_{2}); the portion of area A_{2} from θ = 0 to the tangent line segment $\overline{tF}$ (A_{3}); and the wedge area qFtq (A_{4}). So, the desired area A is A_{1} + (A_{2} − A_{3} + A_{4}) · 2. The area(s) required to be computed are between two quadratic curves, and will necessarily be an integral or difference of integrals.

The primary parameters of the problem are $R$, the tether length defined to be 160yds, and $r$, the radius of the silo. There is no necessary relationship between $R$ and $r$, but here $r=\tfrac{160}{2\pi}$ is the radius of the circle whose circumference is $R$. If one defines the point of tethering $v$ (see diagram, above) as the origin with the circle representing the circumference of the pond below the x-axis, and $F$ on the y-axis below the circle representing the point of intersection of the tether when wound clockwise and counterclockwise, let $t$ be a point on the circle such that the tangent at $t$ intersects $F$, and $|\overset{\frown}{vt}|$ + $|\overline {tF}|$ Is the length of the tether. Let $q$ be the point of intersection of the circumference of the pond on the y-axis (opposite to $v$) below the origin. Then let acute $\angle tFq$ be $\varphi$.

The area under the involute is a function of $R^3$ because it is an integral over a quadratic curve. The area has a fixed boundary defined by the parameter $r$ (i.e. the circumference of the silo). In this case the area is inversely proportional to $r$, i.e. the larger $r$, the smaller the area of the integral, and the circumference is a linear function of $r$ ($2\pi r$). So we seek an expression for the area under the involute $E = f(R^3/r)$.

First, the area A_{1} is a half circle of radius $R$ so $A_1=\tfrac{1}{2}\pi \cdot R^2.$

Next compute the area between the circumference of the pond and involute. Compute the area in the tapering "tail" of the involute, i.e. the overlapped area (note, on account of the tangent tF, that this area includes the wedge section, area A_{4}, which will have to be added back in during the final summation). Recall that the area of a circular sector is $\tfrac {1}{2}r^2 \theta$ if the angle is in radians. Imagine an infinitely thin circular sector from $o$ to $p$ subtended by an infinitely small angle $\Delta\theta$. Tangent to $o$, there is a corresponding infinitely thin sector of the involute from $m$ to $n$ subtending the same infinitely small angle $\Delta\theta$. The area of this sector is $\tfrac{1}{2}z^2\Delta\theta$ where $z$ is the radius at some angle $\theta_i$, which is $r\theta_i$, the arc length of the circle so far "unwrapped" at angle $\theta_i$. The area under the involute is the sum of all the infinitely many infinitely thin sectors $i$ through some angle $\theta_n$. This sum is

$$\lim_{n\to\infty} \sum_{i=1}^n \tfrac{1}{2}(r\theta_i)^2 \Delta\theta = \int_{\frac {3\pi}{2}-\varphi}^{2\pi} \frac{1}{2}(r\theta)^2 \ d\theta  = \frac{1}{2}r^2 \left[\frac {\theta^3}{3}\right]_{\frac {3\pi}{2}-\varphi}^{2\pi} = \frac {4}{3}r^2\pi^3 - \frac{1}{2}r^2\frac{(\frac {3\pi}{2}-\varphi)^3}{3}.$$

The bounds of the integral represent the area under the involute in the fourth quadrant between $\overline{tF}$ and $\overline{vG}$. The angle is measured on the circle, not on the involute, so it is less than $\tfrac{3\pi}{2}$ by some angle designated $\varphi$.

Next, find the angle $\varphi$. Let $x = |\overline{tF}|$. $\varphi$ is complementary to the opposite angle of the triangle whose right angle is at point t; and also complementary to that angle in the third quadrant of the circle. $|\overline{tF}|$ is the unrolled arc $\overset{\frown}{vqt}$, so its arclength is $r$ times the central angle. So $x=r\cdot(\tfrac{3\pi}{2} -\varphi)$. $x$ is also a leg of the triangle vFtv so $\tan(\varphi) = \tfrac{r}{x}$ and $x = \tfrac{r}{\tan(\varphi)}$. Equating the 2 expressions for $x$ and solving for $\varphi$, the following equation is obtained: $\varphi = \tan^{-1}\frac{1}{\tfrac{3\pi}{2}-\varphi}$. That is a transcendental equation that can be solved approximately by iterative substitution of $\varphi$, polynomial expansion of $\tan^{-1}$, or an approximation method like Newton–Raphson. A constructive way to obtain a quick and very accurate estimate of $\varphi$ is: draw a diagonal from point $\tfrac{3}{2} \pi$ on the circumference of the pond to its intersection on the y-axis. The length of the diagonal is 120yds. because it is $\tfrac{3}{4}$ of the tether. So the other leg of the triangle, the hypotenuse as drawn, is $\sqrt{120^2-r^2}=117.27$ yds. So $\varphi\approx \sin^{-1}(\tfrac{r}{117.27})=.219$ radians, rounded to three places. $\varphi\approx 0.21900[+0,-0.00003]$. Small inaccuracies in $\varphi$ when $\varphi\ll1$ don't significantly affect the final result.

A_{4} is the area of the peculiar wedge $\lambda^{tFqt}$. That area is the area of a right triangle with vertex t, minus the area of a sector bounded by $\overset{\frown}{tq}$. $\lambda=\tfrac{rx}{2}-\tfrac{1}{2}r^2\theta$ where x is |tF| and θ is the angle opposite to Φ in the right angle triangle. So, $\lambda=\tfrac{1}{2}r(R-r(\tfrac{\pi}{2}+\varphi))-\tfrac{1}{2}r^2(\tfrac{\pi}{2}-\varphi)=\tfrac{1}{2}(rR-r^2\pi)$. If $R=2\pi r$, then the area $\lambda$ of the wedge is $\tfrac{1}{2}\pi r^2$ by reduction.

Algebraic combination of the pieces does not reduce to anything useful because of the differing geometries of the pieces, and $\varphi$ is not a rational fraction of $\pi$ so it doesn't combine with the other angle. So evaluate the pieces at once then combine them numerically. Since the total area is a bit less than the area of the great circle whose radius is $R$ (80,425sq.yds.), keep 6 digits of precision (5 digits plus a guard digit):

$R = 160$; the length of the tether (given)
$r = \frac{160}{2\pi} = 25.4648$; the radius of the pond
$\varphi = .218979$; the acute angle between tangent line $\overline{tF}$ and the Y axis
$A_1 = \tfrac{1}{2}\pi\cdot R^2 = 40212.4$; the area of the semicircle $\overset{\frown}{GHI}$ whose radius is $R$
$A_2 = \frac {4}{3}r^2\pi^3 = 26808.3$; the swept area of the involute from 0 to $2\pi$
$A_3 = \frac{1}{2}r^2\frac{(\frac {3\pi}{2}-\varphi)^3}{3} = 9805.22$; the swept area of the involute from 0 to $\tfrac{3\pi}{2} - \varphi$
$A_4 = \tfrac{1}{2}\pi r^2 = 1018.59$; the swept area of the involute between tangent line $\overline{vT}$ and the Y axis

Thus $A_2-A_3+A_4$ is the area bounded by the involute and pond in the 4th quadrant.

$A = A_1 + (A_2-A_3+A_4)\cdot 2 \approx 40212.4 + 18021.6\cdot 2 = 76255.6$; the grazing area

The numerical answer is $A=76256$sq.yds.rounded up to the nearest square yard. It is worth noting that $\lim_{\varphi\rightarrow \frac{\pi}{2}} A=\tfrac{1}{2}\pi\cdot R^2 + \tfrac{R^3}{6r}$, which is the answer given for the case where the tether length is half the circumference (or any length such that $\tfrac{R}{r}\leq\pi$) of the silo, or no overlap to account for. The goat can eat all but a bit more than 5% of the area of the great circle defined by its tether length, and almost half the area it cannot eat is within the perimeter of the pond/silo.

=== Solution by ratio of arc length ===
Just as the area below a line is proportional to the length of the line between boundaries, and the area of a circular sector is a ratio of the arc length ($L=r\theta$) of the sector ($A=\tfrac{r}{2}\cdot L$), the area between an involute and its bounding circle is also proportional to the involute's arc length$L=\tfrac{1}{2}r\theta^2$: $A=\tfrac{r\theta}{3}\cdot L =\tfrac{r^2\theta^3}{6}$ for $0<\theta<\theta_i$. So the total grazing area is $A=A_1+(A_2-A_3+A_4)\cdot 2$. $A_1=\tfrac{1}{2}\pi R^2$. $A_2-A_3=\left[\tfrac{r^2\theta^3}{6}\right]_{\tfrac{3\pi}{2}-\varphi}^{2\pi}$.$A_4=\tfrac{1}{2}\pi r^2$.

== Interior grazing problem ==
Interior grazing problem with goat tethered at Q

Let $P$ be the center of a unit circle. A goat/bull/horse is tethered at point $Q$ on the circumference. How long does the rope $r$ need to be to allow the animal to graze on exactly one half of the circle's area (white area in diagram, in plane geometry, called a lens)?

=== Solution by calculating the lens area ===
The area reachable by the animal is in the form of an asymmetric lens, delimited by the two circular arcs.

The area $A$ of a lens with two circles of radii $R, r$ and distance between centers $d$ is

$$\begin{align}
A = {} & r^2 \arccos\left(\frac{d^2 + r^2 - R^2}{2 d r}\right) + R^2 \arccos\left(\frac{d^2 - r^2 + R^2}{2 d R}\right) \\
& {}- \frac{1}{2} \sqrt{(d + r - R) (d - r + R) (-d + r + R) (d + r + R)},
\end{align}$$

which simplifies in case of $R = d = 1$ and one half of the circle area to

$$\frac{1}{2} \pi = r^2 \arccos\left(\frac{1}{2} r\right) + \arccos\left(1 - \frac{1}{2} r^2\right) - \frac{1}{2} r \sqrt{4 - r^2}.$$

The equation can only be solved iteratively and results in $r = 1.1587\ldots$ (sequence A133731 in the OEIS).

=== Solution using integration ===
By using $r < \sqrt{2}$ and integrating over the right half of the lens area with

$$\frac{1}{4} \pi = \int_0^{\sqrt{r^2 - \frac{r^4}{4}}} \left(\sqrt{r^2 - t^2} + \sqrt{1 - t^2} - 1\right)\, dt$$

the transcendental equation

$$r = \frac{\pi}{\pi r - \sqrt{4 - r^2} + \left(\frac{4}{r} - 2 r\right) \arcsin\left(\frac{1}{2} r\right)}$$

follows, with the same solution.

In fact, using the identities $\arccos\left(1 - \frac{r^2}{2}\right) + 2 \arccos\left(\frac{|r|}{2}\right) = \pi$ and $\arcsin\left(\frac{r}{2}\right) = \frac{\pi}{2} - \arccos\left(\frac{r}{2}\right)$, the transcendental equation derived from lens area can be obtained.

=== Solution by sector area plus segment area ===
The area can be written as the sum of sector area plus segment area.

Assuming the leash is tied to the bottom of the pen, define $\theta$ as the angle the taut leash makes with upwards when the goat is at the circumference. Define $\alpha$ as the angle from downwards to the same location, but from the center of the pen instead of from the center of the larger circle. The sum of angles of a triangle equals $\pi$ for the resulting isosceles triangle, giving $\alpha = \pi - 2 \theta$. Setting the pen's radius to be 1 and trigonometry such as $\sin(2 \theta) = 2 \sin(\theta) \cos(\theta)$ then give $\theta = \arccos\left(\frac{r}{2}\right)$.

Requiring that half the grazable area be 1/4 of the pen's area gives $A_{sector} + A_{segment} = \pi / 4$. Using the circular sector and circular segment area formulae gives

$$r^2 \theta + \alpha - \sin(\alpha) = \frac{\pi}{2}$$,

which only assumes $0 < r < 2$.

Combining into a single equation gives

$$\frac{\pi}{2} = r \sqrt{1 - \left(\frac{r}{2}\right)^2} + (2 - r^2) \arccos\left(\frac{r}{2}\right)$$.

Note that solving for $\arccos\left(\frac{r}{2}\right)$ then taking the cosine of both sides generates extra solutions even if including the obvious constraint $1 < r < \sqrt{2}$.

Using trigonometric identities, we see that this is the same transcendental equation that lens area and integration provide.

=== Closed-form solution ===
By using complex analysis methods in 2020, Ingo Ullisch obtained a closed-form solution as the cosine of a ratio of two contour integrals:

$$r = 2 \cos\left(\frac{\displaystyle \oint_C \frac{z}{2\sin z - 2z \cos z - \pi} \,dz}{\displaystyle \oint_C \frac{2}{2\sin z - 2z \cos z - \pi}\, dz}\right),$$

where C is the circle $\left|z-\frac{3\pi}{4}\right|=\frac{\pi}{4}$.

A solution can also be written using Bell polynomials, which follows from the Lagrange inversion theorem:

$r=2\cos\left(\frac{\pi}{4}+\frac{1}{2}-\frac{1}{\pi}+\frac{1}{2}\sum_{n=2}^{\infty}g_{n}\frac{\left(1-\frac{2}{\pi}\right)^{n}}{n!}\right)$

where

$g_{n}=\sum_{k=1}^{n-1}\left(-1\right)^{k}\cdot B_{n-1,k}\left(\hat{f}_{1},\hat{f}_{2},...,\hat{f}_{n-k}\right)\cdot\prod_{i=0}^{k-1}\left(n+i\right),\text{ and}$

$\hat{f}_{k}=\frac{2}{\pi}\frac{k\sin\left(\frac{\pi}{2}k\right)+\frac{\pi}{2}\cos\left(\frac{\pi}{2}k\right)}{k+1}.$

These formulas come from exact expressions for the nth derivative of previous transcendental equations for $r$.

== 3-dimensional extension ==
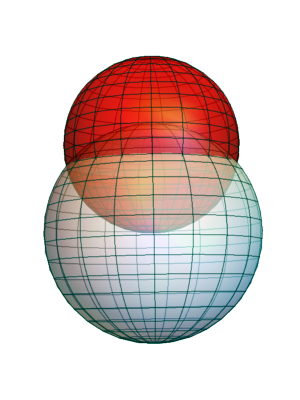
3-dimensional case with unit sphere on top and goat sphere below

The three-dimensional analogue to the two-dimensional goat problem is a bird tethered to the inside of a sphere, with the tether long enough to constrain the bird's flight to half the volume of the sphere. In the three-dimensional case, point $Q$ lies on the surface of a unit sphere, and the problem is to find radius $r$ of the second sphere so that the volume of the intersection body equals exactly half the volume of the unit sphere.

The volume of the unit sphere reachable by the animal has the form of a three-dimensional lens with differently shaped sides and defined by the two spherical caps.

The volume $V$ of a lens with two spheres of radii $R, r$ and distance between the centers $d$ is

$$V = \frac{\pi (R + r - d)^2 \left(d^2 + 2dr - 3r^2 + 2dR + 6rR - 3R^2\right)}{12d},$$

which simplifies in case of $R = d = 1$ and one half of the sphere volume to

$$\frac{1}{2} \cdot \frac{4}{3}\pi = -\frac{1}{4} \pi r^4 + \frac{2}{3} \pi r^3,$$

leading to a solution of $r = 1.2285\ldots$

It can be demonstrated that, with increasing dimensionality, the reachable area approaches one half the sphere at the critical length $r = \sqrt{2}$. If $r < \sqrt{2}$, the area covered approaches almost none of the sphere; if $r > \sqrt{2}$, the area covered approaches the sphere's entire area.

== See also ==
- Mrs. Miniver's problem, another problem of equalizing areas of circular lunes and lenses
