= Sophistic works of Antiphon =

Works by ancient Athenian philosopher

The name Antiphon the Sophist (/ˈæntəˌfɒn, -ən/; Ancient Greek: Ἀντιφῶν) is used to refer to the writer of several Sophistic treatises. He probably lived in Athens in the last two decades of the 5th century BC, but almost nothing is known of his life.

It has been debated since antiquity whether the writer of these Sophistic treatises was in fact none other than Antiphon the Orator, or whether Antiphon the Sophist was indeed a separate person. This remains an active scholarly controversy; of recent editors, Gagarin, and Laks and Most, believe there to be only one Antiphon, whereas G. J. Pendrick argues for the existence of two separate individuals.

The most important of these treatises was On Truth, whose surviving fragments cover many different subjects, from astronomy and mathematics to morality and ethics. Fragments have also been preserved of the treatises On Concord and Politicus; these fragments have sometimes been attributed to the Orator rather than to the Sophist.

It is also not known for certain whether the treatise on the Interpretation of Dreams under the name of Antiphon was written by Antiphon the Sophist, or whether this was written by yet another different Antiphon. The editions of Pendrick and of Laks and Most proceed on the basis that this treatise was written by the same Antiphon as the Sophistic works.

== Antiphon the Sophist ==
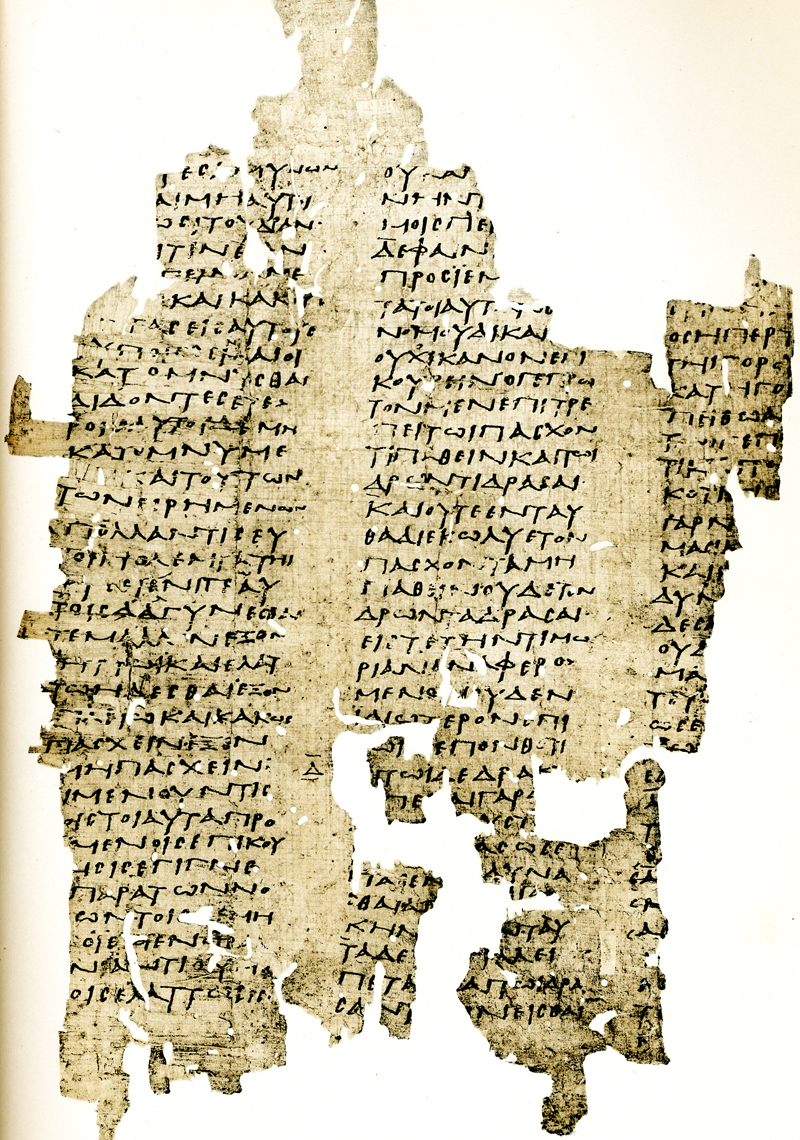
A third-century AD papyrus attributed to the first book of On Truth (P.Oxy. XI 1364 fr. 1, cols. v–vii)

A treatise known as On Truth, of which only fragments survive, is attributed to Antiphon the Sophist. It is of great value to political theory, as it appears to be a precursor to natural rights theory. The views expressed in it suggest its author could not be the same person as Antiphon of Rhamnus, since it was interpreted as affirming strong egalitarian and libertarian principles appropriate to a democracy—but antithetical to the oligarchical views of one who was instrumental in the anti-democratic coup of 411 like Antiphon of Rhamnus. It's been argued that that interpretation has become obsolete in light of a new fragment of text from On Truth discovered in 1984. New evidence supposedly rules out an egalitarian interpretation of the text.

The following passages may confirm the strongly libertarian commitments of Antiphon the Sophist.

=== "Nature" requires liberty ===
On Truth juxtaposes the repressive nature of convention and law (νόμος) with "nature" (φύσις), especially human nature. Nature is envisaged as requiring spontaneity and freedom, in contrast to the often gratuitous restrictions imposed by institutions:

Most of the things which are legally just are [none the less] ... inimical to nature. By law it has been laid down for the eyes what they should see and what they should not see; for the ears what they should hear and they should not hear; for the tongue what it should speak, and what it should not speak; for the hands what they should do and what they should not do ... and for the mind what it should desire, and what it should not desire.

Repression means pain, whereas it is nature (human nature) to shun pain.

Elsewhere, Antiphon wrote: "Life is like a brief vigil, and the duration of life like a single day, as it were, in which having lifted our eyes to the light we give place to other who succeed us." Mario Untersteiner comments: "If death follows according to nature, why torment its opposite, life, which is equally according to nature? By appealing to this tragic law of existence, Antiphon, speaking with the voice of humanity, wishes to shake off everything that can do violence to the individuality of the person." It is reported that Antiphon set up a booth in a public agora where he offered consolation to the bereaved.

=== Mathematics ===
Antiphon was also a capable mathematician. Antiphon, alongside his companion Bryson of Heraclea, was the first to give an upper and lower bound for the value of pi by inscribing and then circumscribing a polygon around a circle and finally proceeding to calculate the polygons' areas. Aristotle and related sources critique Antiphon’s methodology, although Archimedes later uses the same method of exhaustion for his approximation of pi. This method was also applied to the problem of squaring the circle.

=== The Anonymus Iamblichi ===
Iamblichus' Protrepticus contains a lengthy excerpt from an important early author (studied by scholars as part of the Sophistic movement), on education and political philosophy. This passage was originally identified by Friedrich Blass in 1889 as the work of Antiphon, but this attribution has not been generally accepted. This work is accordingly referred to in modern scholarship as the Anonymus Iamblichi.
