= Antiphon (epic poet) =

Interpreter, epic poet and sophist

Antiphon (Ancient Greek: Ἀντιφῶν) of Athens, according to the Suda, was an interpreter of signs, epic poet and sophist, surnamed Logomageiros (Λογομάγειρος), which means both "Word-cook" and "Word-butcher". None of his works are extant, and he is only attested in the Suda.
