= Interpretation of Dreams (Antiphon) =

Work by Antiphon of Athens

The Interpretation of Dreams or Dream-book, (Note: These are the phrases used by Laks and Most, and by Pendrick, respectively, to refer to the treatise. Its exact ancient title is not known; the Suda (s.v. Antiphon) refers to it as a treatise περὶ κρίσεως ὀνείρων, while Cicero (On Divination 1.51.116) refers to it as the somniorum Antiphontis interpretatio (Pendrick p. 49, Laks and Most pp. 88–89).) written by a certain Antiphon (Ἀντιφῶν) of Athens, is an influential ancient treatise on dreams, of which only a few fragments survive.

It is not certain whether the Antiphon who wrote the treatise was the same figure as the Antiphon who wrote the Sophistic works of Antiphon, who is sometimes identified with Antiphon the Orator. The recent scholarly edition of Pendrick sees it as probable that this treatise was written by the same author as the Sophistic works, as does the edition of Laks and Most. Some earlier scholars, including E. R. Dodds, take the view that Antiphon the dream-interpreter was a separate person.

The treatise is notable, in the words of Pendrick, because it "was apparently the first literary work written on the subject of dream-interpretation—or at least the first to have achieved wide circulation". Cicero refers to it, as do Diogenes of Oenoanda and Artemidorus.
