= Ulrike Auhagen =

German university teacher

- Born: November 21, 1967 (age 58); Düsseldorf
- Education: Ludwig-Maximilians-Universität München
- Occupation: German classical philologist

Ulrike Auhagen (born November 21, 1967, in Düsseldorf) is a German classical philologist.

== Life ==
Auhagen studied Latin, Greek and German at the Ludwig-Maximilians-Universität München and the Albert-Ludwigs-Universität Freiburg. Supervised by Eckard Lefèvre she gained her doctorate in Latin Philology (doctoral thesis: "Ovid's monologue"). Since 1993, Auhagen has worked at the University of Freiburg, first as a research assistant, since 1995 as a research associate, in the area "Transitions and tensions between orality and scribality". In addition, she has been a member of the "Academic Senate" since 1998. She became a professor at Bielefeld University in 2007 (postdoctoral thesis: "Hetaera in Greek and Roman comedies"). After her "Umhabilitation" in 2009 (the process when professors get their license to teach at another university) to Freiburg she became what is known as an "extraordinary professor" in 2012.
