= Oenopides =

5th-century BCE Greek mathematician and astronomer

Oenopides of Chios
- Born: c. 490 BCE; Chios
- Died: 420 BCE

Oenopides of Chios (Greek: Οἰνοπίδης ὁ Χῖος; born c. 490 BCE) was an ancient Greek geometer, astronomer and mathematician, who lived around 450 BCE.

== Biography ==
The only fact about the early life of Oenopides is his birthplace on the island of Chios. According to Proclus, he was a little younger than Anaxagoras, which puts his birth to around 490 BCE. Some believe he spent time in Athens, although there is little evidence for it. Plato mentions him in his Rivals, but this only proves word of his discoveries had reached Athens, perhaps through Hippocrates of Chios. The historian Diodorus Siculus tells us Oenopides received his education in Egypt from the priests just as other legendary Greek astronomers and geometers had done. Most scholars believe stories of travels are fabricated.

== Astronomy ==
Eudemus in his History of Astronomy names Oenopides among the eminent Greek astronomers, sometimes listing him ahead of all others. He was the first to write down the methods of astronomy and was unsurpassed in the field until Eudoxus. Some have tried to tarnish his reputation. Aetius criticized that he stole credit from the Pythagoreans. Diodorus Siculus claimed he learned everything from the Egyptian priests.

=== Inclination of the Zodiac ===
The main accomplishment of Oenopides as an astronomer was his determination of the angle between the plane of the celestial equator, and the zodiac (the yearly path of the Sun in the sky). This feat was recorded in Eudemus' History of Astronomy. In effect it amounted to measuring the inclination of the Earth's axis. Oenopides's result remained the standard value for two centuries, until Eratosthenes measured it with greater precision.

Some suppose he found the angle to be 24° although nowhere is this directly attested. A comment by Proclus suggests some geometric theorems were useful for astronomy, as the construction of the Pentadecagon was useful for the inclination of the zodiac. Since the exterior angle of a regular polygon with 15 sides is 24°, and since Proclus attributes another geometric problem to Oenopides as useful for astronomy, this is how the claim is made. The only problem is our primary source Eudemus says other astronomers deduced the angle to be 24°, so Oenopides might have held a different value.

=== Revolution of the Great Year ===
In the same passage Eudemus tells us Oenopides determined the value of the Great Year and was the first to define it. For him, the Great Year was the smallest number of years that was equal to an integer number of lunar months. As the relative positions of the Sun and Moon repeat themselves after each Great Year, this offers a means to predict solar and lunar eclipses.

Oenopides put the Great Year at 59 years, corresponding to 730 months. This was a good approximation, but not a perfect one, since 59 tropical years is 21550 days, while 730 lunar months is 21557.3 days. Additionally, a 59 year period also aligns with Jupiter and Saturn. Jupiter makes 5 revolutions in 21662.9 days, and Saturn makes 2 revolutions in 21511.4 days. Later astronomers, Meton, Euctemon, and Callippus sought to improve Oenopides's result.

How did Oenopides achieve this estimate? Thomas Heath supposes Oenopides began with 365 days in a year and 29½ days in a lunar month. Now twice 29½ gives 59, and twice 365 gives 730. This is where the values 59 and 730 may have originated.

=== Length of the Year ===
Oenopides declared the length of the year to be 365 and 22/59 days. Thomas Heath submits that if Oenopides knew 730 lunar months was 21557 days, dividing that by 59 years gives the value 365 and 22/59.

== Geometry ==
In the famous Eudemian Summary, Oenopides is listed among the famous elementary geometers. Proclus relates Oenopides followed in the footsteps of Anaxagoras, they both applied themselves to many questions in geometry. Surely he means Anaxagoras' attempt to square the circle. But Oenopides appears to have only been a geometer insofar as it helped him with astronomical research. However, he may have contributed to geometry in other ways, as the followers of Zenodotus belonged to the "succession of Oenopides." It is speculated Oenopides must have been a close friend or colleague of the geometer Hippocrates of Chios.

=== Methodology ===
While Oenopides's innovations as an astronomer mainly concern practical issues, as a geometer he seems to have been rather a theorist and methodologist, who set himself the task to make geometry comply with higher standards of theoretical purity. This is shown through the activities by his so-called succession. They introduced the distinction between a theorem and a problem. A theorem seeks out attributes in the thing it investigates. A problem asks can if a thing can exist (or be constructed) under certain conditions. These distinctions held and were preserved in the Elements, every proposition is either a theorem or a problem. It is curious that Oenopides inspired this development so early in Greek mathematics. Zhmud challenges this tradition and suggests a later Hellenist era mathematician also named Oenopides contributed this methodology, and Proclus failed to see the distinction.

=== A Problem with Perpendicular Lines ===
Proclus relates that Oenopides was the first to investigate the 12th proposition in Euclid's Elements: to draw a perpendicular line from a given point to a given line. We are not told how Oenopides solved this problem. Apparently he thought it was useful for astronomy. Notably, in archaic fashion, Oenopides called the perpendicular line drawn, "gnomonwise," because a gnomon is at right angles to the horizon. Proclus does not give a source, but it is peculiar in an analogous statement it is said Thales used an archaic term for equal angles, instead describing them as "similar".

=== A Problem with Equal Angles ===
On Eudemus' authority, Proclus says the 23rd proposition of the Elements is due to Oenopides. This problem requires us to construct an angle equal to a given angle. We are not told how Oenopides solved this problem or why he thought it useful for study. It may be that he used this theorem to construct the pentagon, which he then in turn used to construct the pentadecagon, if he indeed constructed the pentadecagon at all.

== Natural Philosophy ==
Oenopides engaged in natural philosophy, too. To engage in "physics" was commonplace for the earliest Greek philosophers and mathematicians. His contemporary Hippocrates of Chios, primarily known for his mathematics, also has some natural philosophy.

=== Seasonal Water Temperature ===
Oenopides noticed a strange paradox that in the summer season, the waters in the earth are cold, but in the winter, they are warm. The ancients saw evidence of this in wells, for in the peak of winter, the water in them is warmest, but in the greatest heat, only cold water is drawn from them. His explanation for this phenomenon is thus. In winter, as the sun is more often below the earth, it emits water, but in summer, when the sun is more often above the earth, it no longer does so due to the greater heat. Therefore, the earth, being more saturated, yields more water.

=== Seasonal River Flooding ===
Oenopides and Herodotus say that rivers tend to dry up in the winter due to less rainfall (and likely more snowfall). As it gets warmer, there is more rainfall (and snowmelt) causing big rivers like the Nile to finally be replenished and overflow. However, some ancients disagreed with this theory, stating many rivers in Libya are filled in winter and dry up in summer. There is a passage in where Herodotus gives many explanations for the flooding of the Nile (Histories 2.20 - 2.22) quoting certain Greeks who wish to be known for their wisdom. He does not credit any of the explanations. Traditionally, the first theory is ascribed to Thales, and now the third theory is due to Oenopides.

=== The Principle ===
Determining the principle of nature was popular in Pre-Socratic philosophy. Oenopides said the material principle was both fire and air.

=== The Deity ===
Oenopides says that God is the soul of the cosmos. Later, Diogenes of Apollonia and Cleanthes followed in his footsteps.

=== The Origin of the Milky Way ===
He held the opinion that formerly the Sun had moved along the Milky Way. However, when it saw how Thyestes, a mythological figure, was served his own son for dinner by his brother Atreus, the Sun was so horrified that it left its course and moved to the zodiac instead. Aristotle attributes this mythology to the Pythagoreans.

== Sayings ==
The following sayings are attributed to Oenopides:

- He once said, "as is the nature of a man, so is his speech."
- Seeing a young man acquiring many books, he said: "Do not store them in the chest, but in the heart."
