= Antiphon (tragic poet) =

Antiphon (Ancient Greek: Ἀντιφῶν) was in ancient Greece a tragic poet whom Plutarch, Philostratus, and others, confused with the Attic orator Antiphon, who was put to death at Athens in 411 BCE. Antiphon the tragic poet lived at Syracuse, Magna Graecia, at the court of Dionysius I of Syracuse, who did not assume the tyranny till the year 406 BCE, that is, five years after the death of the Attic orator Antiphon.

The poet Antiphon is said to have written dramas in conjunction with the tyrant, who is not known to have shown interest in writing poetry until the latter period of his life. These circumstances alone, if there were not many others, would show that the orator and the poet were two different persons, and that the latter must have survived the former by many years.

The poet was put to death by Dionysius, according to some accounts, for having used a sarcastic expression in regard to tyranny, or, according to others, for having imprudently censured the tyrant's compositions. We still know the titles of five of Antiphon's tragedies: Andromache, Jason, Medeia, Meleager, and Philoctetes.
