= Hippocrates of Chios =

5th-century BC Greek mathematician and astronomer

The Lune of Hippocrates. Partial solution of the "Squaring the circle" task, suggested by Hippocrates. The area of the shaded figure is equal to the area of the triangle ABC. This is not a complete solution of the task (the complete solution is proven to be impossible with compass and straightedge).

Hippocrates of Chios (Ancient Greek: Ἱπποκράτης ὁ Χῖος; c. 470 – c. 421 BC) was an ancient Greek mathematician, geometer, and astronomer.

He was born on the isle of Chios, where he was originally a merchant. After some misadventures (he was robbed by either pirates or fraudulent customs officials) he went to Athens, possibly for litigation, where he became a leading mathematician.

On Chios, Hippocrates may have been a pupil of the mathematician and astronomer Oenopides of Chios. In his mathematical work there probably was some Pythagorean influence too, perhaps via contacts between Chios and the neighboring island of Samos, a center of Pythagorean thinking: Hippocrates has been described as a 'para-Pythagorean', a philosophical 'fellow traveler'. "Reduction" arguments such as reductio ad absurdum argument (or proof by contradiction) have been traced to him, as has the use of power to denote the square of a line.

== Mathematics ==
The major accomplishment of Hippocrates is that he was the first to write a systematically organized geometry textbook, called Elements (Στοιχεῖα, Stoicheia), that is, basic theorems, or building blocks of mathematical theory. From then on, mathematicians from all over the ancient world could, at least in principle, build on a common framework of basic concepts, methods, and theorems, which stimulated the scientific progress of mathematics.

Only a single, famous fragment of Hippocrates' Elements is existent, embedded in the work of Simplicius. In this fragment the area is calculated of some so-called Hippocratic lunes. This was part of a research program to square the circle, that is, to construct a square with the same area as a circle. Although Hippocrates failed to square the circle, he was the first to prove an equality of area between a curved shape and a polygonal shape. Only much later was it proven (by Ferdinand von Lindemann, in 1882) that this approach had no chance of success, because the side length of the square would have a transcendental ratio $\sqrt\pi$ to the radius of the circle, impossible to construct using compass and straightedge.

In the century after Hippocrates, at least four other mathematicians wrote their own Elements, steadily improving terminology and logical structure. In this way, Hippocrates' pioneering work laid the foundation for Euclid's Elements (c. 325 BC), which was to remain the standard geometry textbook for many centuries. Hippocrates is believed to have originated the use of letters to refer to the geometric points and figures in a proposition, e.g., "triangle ABC" for a triangle with vertices at points A, B, and C.

Two other contributions by Hippocrates in the field of mathematics are noteworthy. He found a way to tackle the problem of 'duplication of the cube', that is, the problem of how to construct a cube root. Like the quadrature of the circle, this was another of the so-called three great mathematical problems of antiquity. Hippocrates also invented the technique of 'reduction', that is, to transform specific mathematical problems into a more general problem that is easier to solve. The solution to the more general problem then automatically gives a solution to the original problem.

== Astronomy ==
In the field of astronomy, Hippocrates tried to explain the phenomena of comets and the Milky Way. His ideas have not been handed down very clearly, but he probably thought both were optical illusions, the result of refraction of solar light by moisture that was exhaled by, respectively, a putative planet near the Sun, and the stars. The fact that Hippocrates thought that light rays originated in our eyes instead of in the object that is seen, adds to the unfamiliar character of his ideas.
