= Eudoxus of Cnidus =

Greek astronomer and mathematician (c.390–c.340 BC)

Eudoxus
- Born: c. 390 BC; Cnidus, Anatolia (now Yazıköy, Muğla, Turkey)
- Died: c. 340 BC (aged c. 50); Cnidus, Anatolia
- Known for: Kampyle of Eudoxus; Concentric spheres
- Scientific career
- Fields: Mathematics; Physics; Geography; Astronomy; Medicine; Philosophy

Eudoxus of Cnidus (/juːˈdɒksəs/; Ancient Greek: Εὔδοξος ὁ Κνίδιος, Eúdoxos ho Knídios; c. 390 – c. 340 BC) was an ancient Greek astronomer, mathematician, doctor, and lawmaker. He was a student of Archytas and Plato. All of his original works are lost, though some fragments are preserved in Hipparchus's Commentaries on the Phenomena of Aratus and Eudoxus. Spherics by Theodosius of Bithynia may be based on a work by Eudoxus.

== Life ==
Eudoxus, son of Aeschines, was born and died in Cnidus (also transliterated Knidos), a city on the southwest coast of Anatolia. The years of Eudoxus's birth and death are not fully known but Diogenes Laërtius gave several biographical details, mentioned that Apollodorus said he reached his acme in the 103rd Olympiad (368–365 BC), and claimed he died in his 53rd year. From this 19th century mathematical historians reconstructed dates of 408–355 BC, but 20th century scholars found their choices contradictory and prefer a birth year of c. 390 BC. His name Eudoxus means "honored" or "of good repute" (εὔδοξος, from eu "good" and doxa "opinion, belief, fame", analogous to the Latin Benedictus).

According to Diogenes Laërtius, crediting Callimachus' Pinakes, Eudoxus studied mathematics with Archytas (of Tarentum, Magna Graecia) and studied medicine with Philiston the Sicilian. At the age of 23, he traveled with the physician Theomedon—who was his patron and possibly his lover—to Athens to study with the followers of Socrates. He spent two months there—living in Piraeus and walking 7 miles (11 km) each way every day to attend the Sophists' lectures—then returned home to Cnidus. His friends then paid to send him to Heliopolis, Egypt for 16 months, to pursue his study of astronomy and mathematics. From Egypt, he then traveled north to Cyzicus, located on the south shore of the Sea of Marmara, the Propontis. He traveled south to the court of Mausolus. During his travels he gathered many students of his own.

Around 368 BC, Eudoxus returned to Athens with his students. According to some sources, c. 367 he assumed headship (scholarch) of the Academy during Plato's period in Syracuse, and taught Aristotle. He eventually returned to his native Cnidus, where he served in the city assembly. While in Cnidus, he built an observatory and continued writing and lecturing on theology, astronomy, and meteorology. He had one son, Aristagoras, and three daughters, Actis, Philtis, and Delphis.

In mathematical astronomy, his fame is due to the introduction of the concentric spheres, and his early contributions to understanding the movement of the planets. He is also credited, by the poet Aratus, with having constructed a celestial globe.

His work on proportions shows insight into irrational numbers and the linear continuum: it allows rigorous treatment of continuous quantities and not just whole numbers or even rational numbers. When it was revived by Tartaglia and others in the 16th century, it became the basis for quantitative work in science, and inspired Richard Dedekind's work on the real numbers.

== Mathematics ==
Eudoxus is considered by some to be the greatest of classical Greek mathematicians, and in all Antiquity second only to Archimedes. Eudoxus was probably the source for most of book V of Euclid's Elements. He rigorously developed Antiphon's method of exhaustion, a precursor to the integral calculus which was also used in a masterly way by Archimedes in the following century. In applying the method, Eudoxus proved such mathematical statements as: areas of circles are to one another as the squares of their radii, volumes of spheres are to one another as the cubes of their radii, the volume of a pyramid is one-third the volume of a prism with the same base and altitude, and the volume of a cone is one-third that of the corresponding cylinder.

Eudoxus introduced the idea of non-quantified mathematical magnitude to describe and work with continuous geometrical entities such as lines, angles, areas and volumes, thereby avoiding the use of irrational numbers. In doing so, he reversed a Pythagorean emphasis on number and arithmetic, focusing instead on geometrical concepts as the basis of rigorous mathematics. Some Pythagoreans, such as Eudoxus's teacher Archytas, had believed that only arithmetic could provide a basis for proofs. Induced by the need to understand and operate with incommensurable quantities, Eudoxus established what may have been the first deductive organization of mathematics on the basis of explicit axioms. The change in focus by Eudoxus stimulated a divide in mathematics which lasted two thousand years. In combination with a Greek intellectual attitude unconcerned with practical problems, there followed a significant retreat from the development of techniques in arithmetic and algebra.

The Pythagoreans had discovered that the diagonal of a square does not have a common unit of measurement with the sides of the square; this is the famous discovery that the square root of 2 cannot be expressed as the ratio of two integers. This discovery had heralded the existence of incommensurable quantities beyond the integers and rational fractions, but at the same time it threw into question the idea of measurement and calculations in geometry as a whole. For example, Euclid provides an elaborate proof of the Pythagorean theorem (Elements I.47), by using addition of areas and only much later (Elements VI.31) a simpler proof from similar triangles, which relies on ratios of line segments.

Ancient Greek mathematicians calculated not with quantities and equations as we do today; instead, a proportionality expressed a relationship between geometric magnitudes. The ratio of two magnitudes was not a numerical value, as we think of it today; the ratio of two magnitudes was a primitive relationship between them.

Eudoxus is credited with defining equality between two ratios, the subject of Book V of the Elements.

In Definition 5 of Euclid's Book V we read:

Magnitudes are said to be in the same ratio, the first to the second and the third to the fourth when, if any equimultiples whatever be taken of the first and third, and any equimultiples whatever of the second and fourth, the former equimultiples alike exceed, are alike equal to, or alike fall short of, the latter equimultiples respectively taken in corresponding order.

Using modern notation, this can be made more explicit. Given four quantities $a$, $b$, $c$, and $d$, take the ratio of the first to the second, $a/b$, and the ratio of the third to the fourth, $c/d$. That the two ratios are proportional, $a/b = c/d$, can be defined by the following condition:

For any two arbitrary positive integers $m$ and $n$, form the equimultiples $m\cdot a$ and $m \cdot c$ of the first and third; likewise form the equimultiples $n\cdot b$ and $n\cdot d$ of the second and fourth. If it happens that $m\cdot a > n \cdot b$, then also $m\cdot c > n\cdot d$. If instead $m\cdot a = n\cdot b$, then also $m\cdot c = n\cdot d$. Finally, if $m\cdot a < n\cdot b$, then also $m\cdot c < n\cdot d$.

This means that $a/b = c/d$ if and only if the ratios $n/m$ that are larger than $a/b$ are the same as the ones that are larger than $c/d$, and likewise for "equal" and "smaller". This can be compared with Dedekind cuts that define a real number by the set of rational numbers that are larger, equal or smaller than the number to be defined.

Eudoxus's definition depends on comparing the similar quantities $m\cdot a$ and $n\cdot b$, and the similar quantities $m\cdot c$ and $n\cdot d$, and does not depend on the existence of a common unit for measuring these quantities.

The complexity of the definition reflects the deep conceptual and methodological innovation involved. The Eudoxian definition of proportionality uses the quantifier, "for every ..." to harness the infinite and the infinitesimal, similar to the modern epsilon-delta definitions of limit and continuity.

The Archimedean property, definition 4 of Elements Book V, was credited to Eudoxus by Archimedes.

== Astronomy ==
In ancient Greece, astronomy was a branch of mathematics; astronomers sought to create geometrical models that could imitate the appearances of celestial motions. Identifying the astronomical work of Eudoxus as a separate category is therefore a modern convenience. Some of Eudoxus's astronomical texts whose names have survived include:

- Disappearances of the Sun, possibly on eclipses
- Oktaeteris (Ὀκταετηρίς), on an eight-year lunisolar-Venus cycle of the calendar
- Phaenomena (Φαινόμενα) and Enoptron (Ἔνοπτρον), on spherical astronomy, probably based on observations made by Eudoxus in Egypt and Cnidus
- On Speeds, on planetary motions

We are fairly well informed about the contents of Phaenomena, for Eudoxus's prose text was the basis for a poem of the same name by Aratus. Hipparchus quoted from the text of Eudoxus in his commentary on Aratus.

=== Eudoxan planetary models ===
A general idea of the content of On Speeds can be gleaned from Aristotle's Metaphysics XII, 8, and a commentary by Simplicius of Cilicia (6th century AD) on De caelo, another work by Aristotle. According to a story reported by Simplicius, Plato posed a question for Greek astronomers: "By the assumption of what uniform and orderly motions can the apparent motions of the planets be accounted for?" Plato proposed that the seemingly chaotic wandering motions of the planets could be explained by combinations of uniform circular motions centered on a spherical Earth, apparently a novel idea in the 4th century BC.

In most modern reconstructions of the Eudoxan model, the Moon is assigned three spheres:

- The outermost rotates westward once in 24 hours, explaining rising and setting.
- The second rotates eastward once in a month, explaining the monthly motion of the Moon through the zodiac.
- The third also completes its revolution in a month, but its axis is tilted at a slightly different angle, explaining motion in latitude (deviation from the ecliptic), and the motion of the lunar nodes.

The Sun is also assigned three spheres. The second completes its motion in a year instead of a month. The inclusion of a third sphere implies that Eudoxus mistakenly believed that the Sun had motion in latitude.

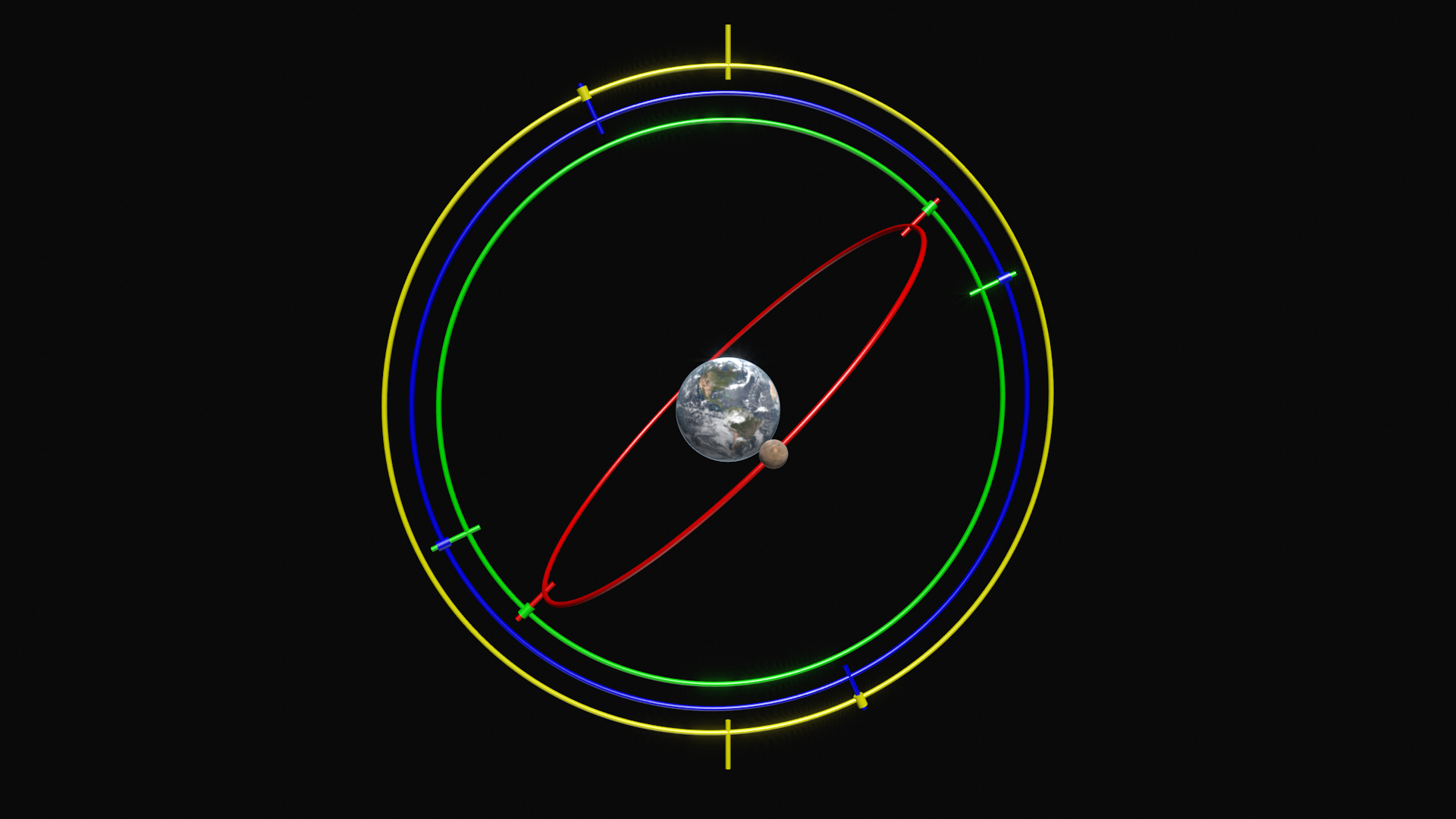
Eudoxus's model of planetary motion. Each of his homocentric spheres is represented as a ring which rotates on the axis shown. The outermost (yellow) sphere rotates once per day; the second (blue) describes the planet's motion through the zodiac; the third (green) and fourth (red) together move the planet along a figure-eight curve (or hippopede) to explain retrograde motion.

Animation depicting Eudoxus's model of retrograde planetary motion. The two innermost spheres turn with the same period but in opposite directions, moving the planet along a figure-eight curve, or hippopede.

The five visible planets (Mercury, Venus, Mars, Jupiter, and Saturn) are assigned four spheres each:

- The outermost explains the daily motion.
- The second explains the planet's motion through the zodiac.
- The third and fourth together explain retrogradation, when a planet appears to slow down, then briefly reverse its motion through the zodiac. By inclining the axes of the two spheres with respect to each other, and rotating them in opposite directions but with equal periods, Eudoxus could make a point on the inner sphere trace out a figure-eight shape, or hippopede.

=== Importance of Eudoxan system ===
Callippus, a Greek astronomer of the 4th century, added seven spheres to Eudoxus's original 27 (in addition to the planetary spheres, Eudoxus included a sphere for the fixed stars). Aristotle described both systems, but insisted on adding "unrolling" spheres between each set of spheres to cancel the motions of the outer set. Aristotle was concerned about the physical nature of the system; without unrollers, the outer motions would be transferred to the inner planets.

A major flaw in the Eudoxian system is its inability to explain changes in the brightness of planets as seen from Earth. Because the spheres are concentric, planets will always remain at the same distance from Earth. This problem was pointed out in Antiquity by Autolycus of Pitane. Astronomers responded by introducing the deferent and epicycle, which caused a planet to vary its distance. However, Eudoxus's importance to astronomy and in particular to Greek astronomy is considerable.

== Ethics ==
Aristotle, in the Nicomachean Ethics, attributes to Eudoxus an argument in favor of hedonism—that is, that pleasure is the ultimate good that activity strives for. According to Aristotle, Eudoxus put forward the following arguments for this position:

1. All things, rational and irrational, aim at pleasure; things aim at what they believe to be good; a good indication of what the chief good is would be the thing that most things aim at.
2. Similarly, pleasure's opposite—pain—is universally avoided, which provides additional support for the idea that pleasure is universally considered good.
3. People do not seek pleasure as a means to something else, but as an end in its own right.
4. Any other good that you can think of would be better if pleasure were added to it, and it is only by good that good can be increased.
5. Of all of the things that are good, happiness is peculiar for not being praised, which may show that it is the crowning good.

== Legacy ==
Craters on Mars and the Moon are named in his honor. An algebraic curve (the kampyle of Eudoxus) is also named after him.

== See also ==
- Eudoxus reals (a fairly recently discovered construction of the real numbers, named in his honor)
- Delian problem
- Incommensurable magnitudes
- Speusippus

== Bibliography ==
- Ball, Walter William Rouse (1908). A Short Account of the History of Mathematics (4th ed.). Dover Publications. ISBN 9780486206301.
- Evans, James (1998). The History and Practice of Ancient Astronomy. Oxford University Press. ISBN 0-19-509539-1. OCLC 185509676.
- Hultsch, Friedrich (1907). "Eudoxos Von Knidos" . In Pauly, August; Wissowa, Georg (eds.). Realencyclopädie der classischen Altertumswissenschaft (in German). Vol. 6.1. pp. 930–950 – via Wikisource.
- Huxley, GL (1980). Eudoxus of Cnidus p. 465-7 in: the Dictionary of Scientific Biography, volume 4.
- Huxley, G. L. (1963). "Eudoxian Topics". Greek, Roman, and Byzantine Studies. 4: 83–96.
- Knorr, Wilbur Richard (1978). "Archimedes and the Pre-Euclidean Proportion Theory". Archives Internationales d'Histoire des Sciences. 28: 183–244.
- Knorr, Wilbur R. (1986). The Ancient tradition of geometric problems. Boston: Birkhäuser. ISBN 0-8176-3148-8.
- Lasserre, François (1966) Die Fragmente des Eudoxos von Knidos (de Gruyter: Berlin)
- Laërtius, Diogenes. "Pythagoreans: Eudoxus" . Lives of the Eminent Philosophers. Vol. 2:8. Translated by Hicks, Robert Drew (Two volume ed.). Loeb Classical Library.
- Manitius, C. (1894) Hipparchi in Arati et Eudoxi Phaenomena Commentariorum Libri Tres (Teubner)
- Neugebauer, O. (1975). A history of ancient mathematical astronomy. Berlin: Springer-Verlag. ISBN 0-387-06995-X.
- Van der Waerden, B. L. (1988). Science Awakening (5th ed.). Leiden: Noordhoff.
