= Bride's Chair =

Illustration of the Pythagorean theorem

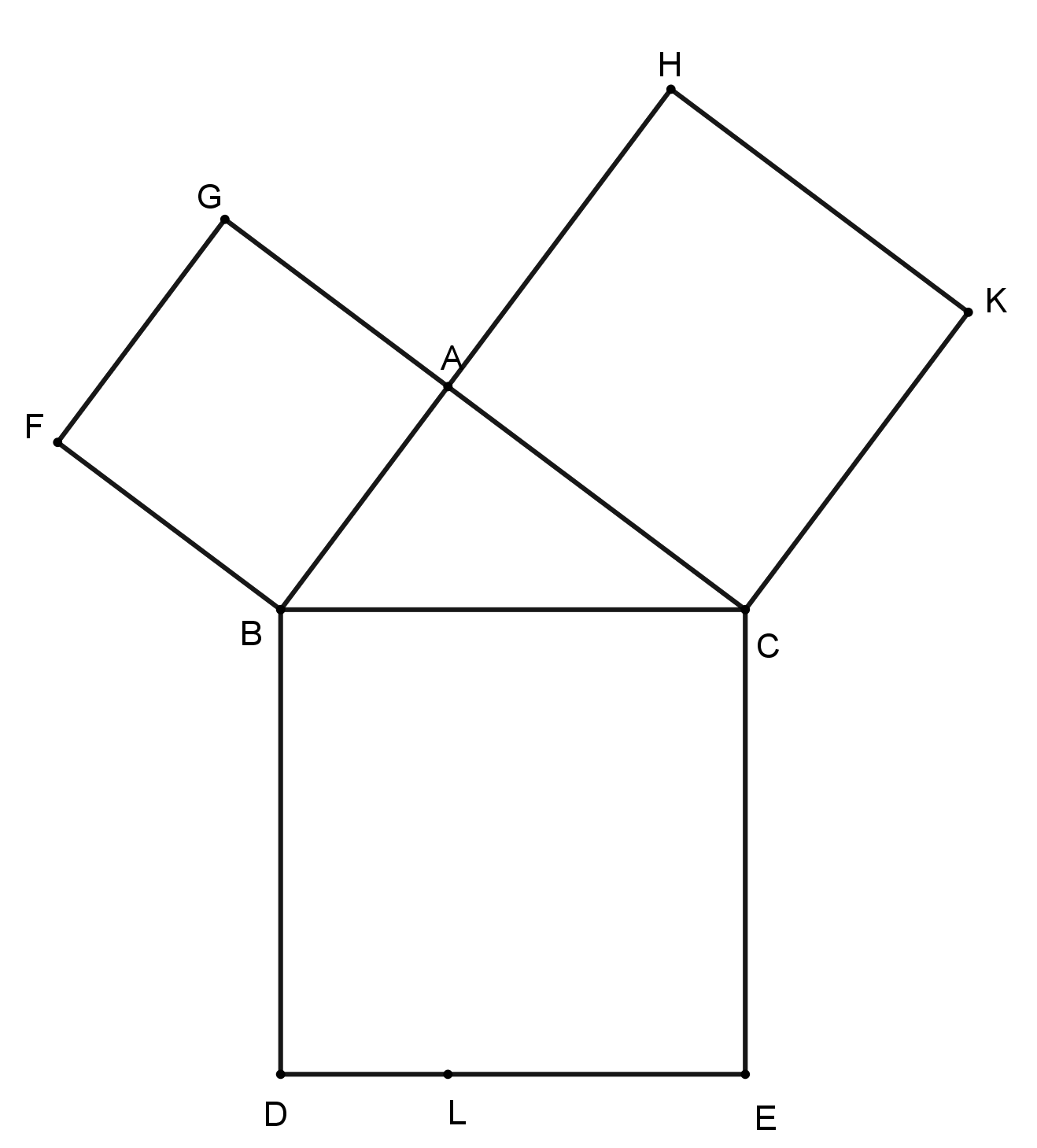
Bride's Chair: Illustration of Pythagorean theorem

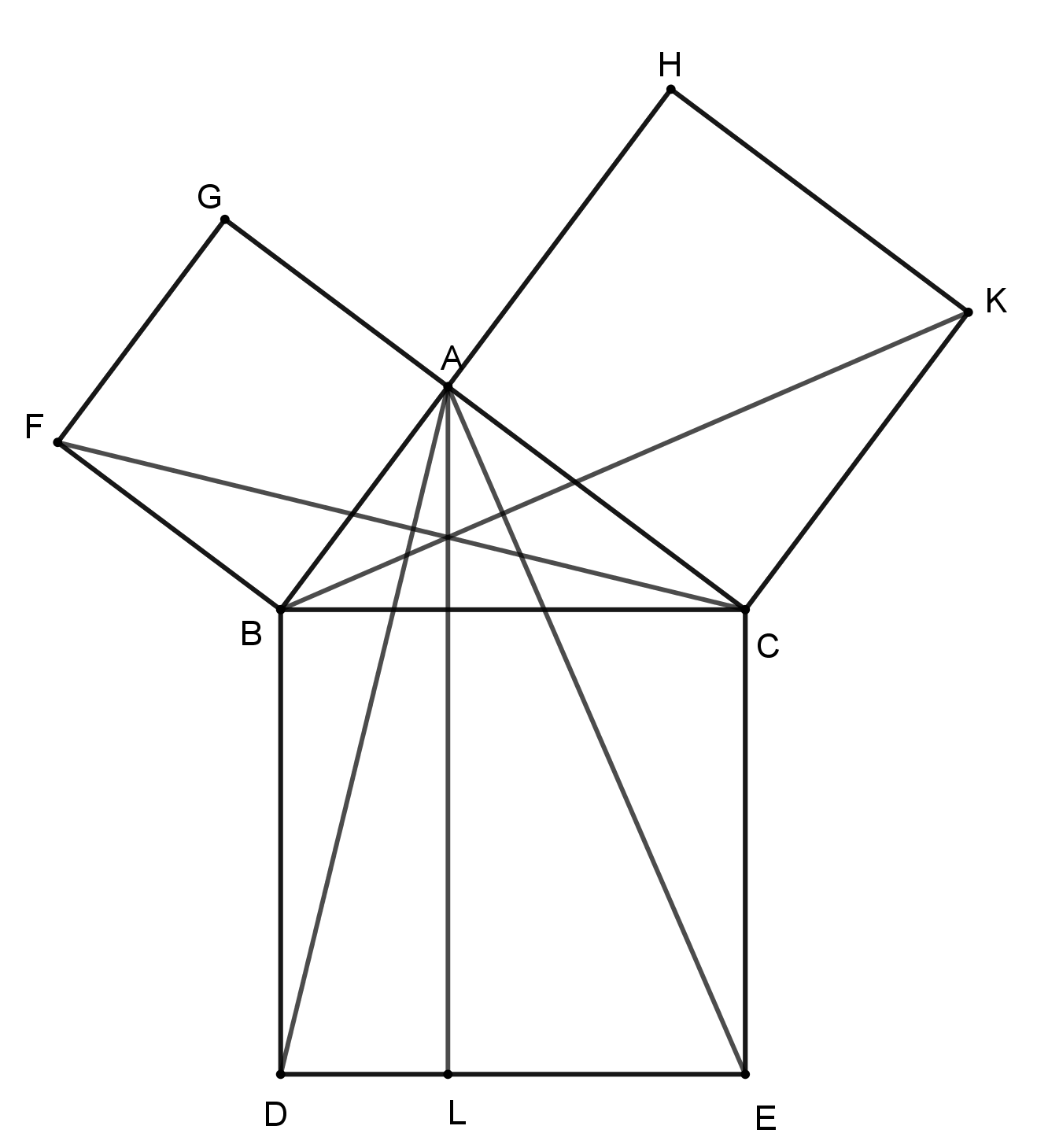
Bride's Chair: The figure used by Euclid to explain the proof of Pythagorean theorem

In geometry, a Bride's Chair is an illustration of the Pythagorean theorem. The figure appears in Proposition 47 of Book I of Euclid's Elements. It is also known by several other names, such as the Franciscan's cowl, peacock's tail, windmill, Pythagorean pants, Figure of the Bride, theorem of the married women, and chase of the little married women.

According to Swiss-American historian of mathematics Florian Cajori, the ultimate etymology of the term "Bride's Chair" lies in a Greek homonym: "Some Arabic writers [...] call the Pythagorean theorem 'figure of the bride'." The Greek word νυμφη has two relevant definitions: 'bride', and 'winged insect'. The figure of a right triangle with the three squares has reminded various writers of an insect, so the 'insect' sense of the Greek word came to be applied to right triangles with three squares, and to the Pythagorean theorem. Arabic speakers writing in Greek would often mistakenly assume the other sense of the word was intended, and would translate the phrase back into Arabic using the word for 'bride'.

A nice illustration of the Bride's Chair showing a chair upon which, according to ancient tradition, a bride might have been carried to the marriage ceremony can be seen in Sidney J. Kolpas' The Pythagorean Theorem: Eight Classic Proofs (page 3).

== As a proof ==
The proof presented below is an excerpt from Pythagorean theorem § Euclid's proof

The Bride's chair proof of the Pythagorean theorem, that is, the proof of the Pythagorean theorem based on the Bride's Chair diagram, is given below. The proof has been severely criticized by the German philosopher Arthur Schopenhauer as being unnecessarily complicated, with construction lines drawn here and there and a long line of deductive steps. According to Schopenhauer, the proof is a "brilliant piece of perversity".

The basic idea of the Bride's Chair proof of the Pythagorean theorem

1. From A, draw a line parallel to BD and CE. It will perpendicularly intersect BC and DE at K and L, respectively.
2. Join CF and AD, to form the triangles BCF and BDA.
3. Angles CAB and BAG are both right angles; therefore C, A, and G are collinear.
4. Angles CBD and FBA are both right angles; therefore angle ABD equals angle FBC, since both are the sum of a right angle and angle ABC.
5. Since AB is equal to FB, BD is equal to BC and angle ABD equals angle FBC, triangle ABD must be congruent to triangle FBC.
6. Since A-K-L is a straight line, parallel to BD, then rectangle BDLK has twice the area of triangle ABD because they share the base BD and have the same altitude BK, i.e., a line normal to their common base, connecting the parallel lines BD and AL.
7. Since C is collinear with A and G, and this line is parallel to FB, then square BAGF must be twice in area to triangle FBC.
8. Therefore, rectangle BDLK must have the same area as square BAGF = AB^{2}.
9. By applying steps 3 to 10 to the other side of the figure, it can be similarly shown that rectangle CKLE must have the same area as square ACIH = AC^{2}.
10. Adding these two results, AB^{2} + AC^{2} = BD × BK + KL × KC
11. Since BD = KL, BD × BK + KL × KC = BD(BK + KC) = BD × BC
12. Therefore, AB^{2} + AC^{2} = BC^{2}, since CBDE is a square.

== A different Bride's Chair ==
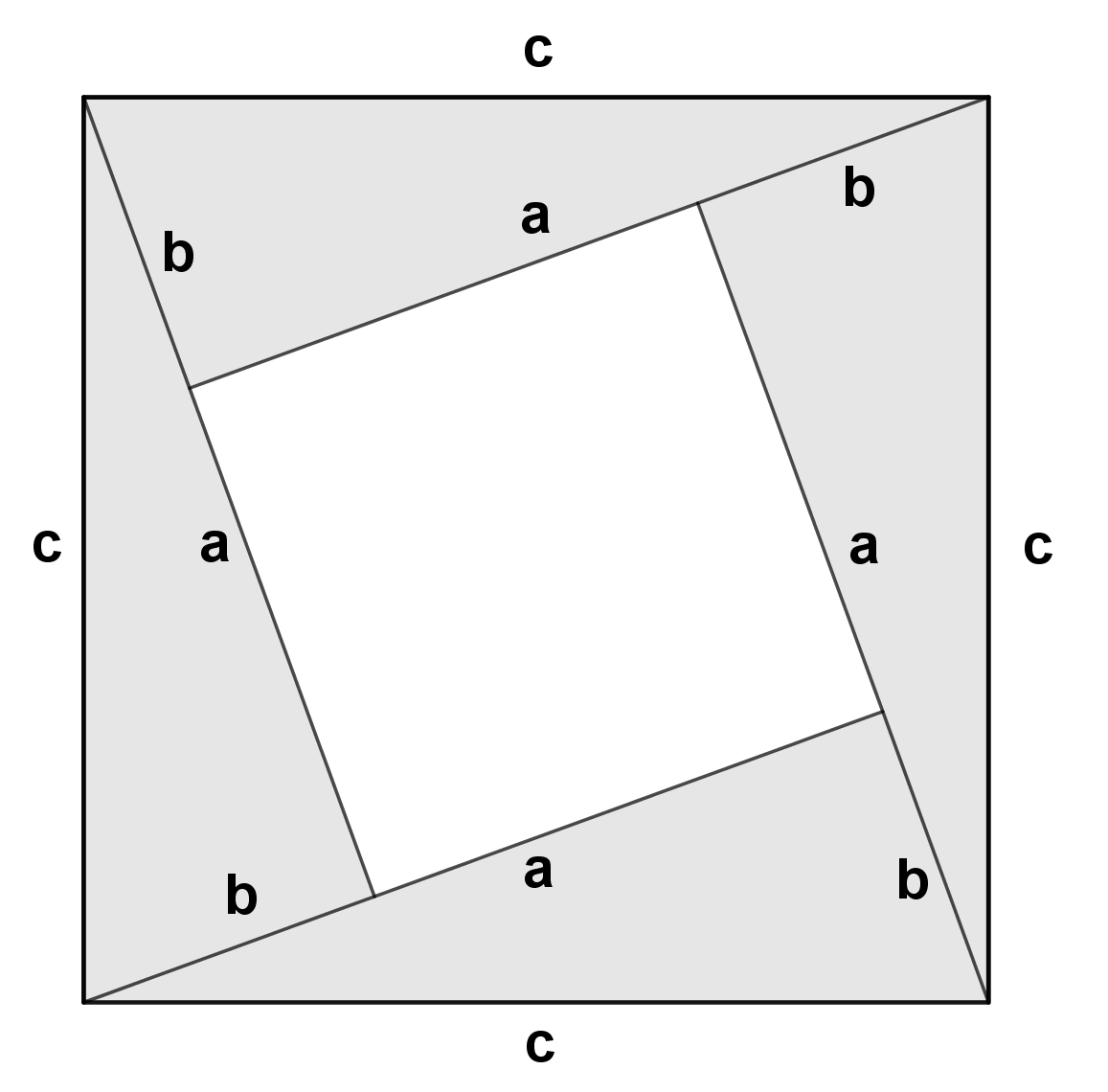
Bride's chair: Diagram illustrating Bhaskara II's proof of Pythagorean theorem

The name Bride's Chair is also used to refer to a certain diagram attributed to the twelfth century Indian mathematician Bhāskara II (c. 1114–1185) who used it as an illustration for the proof of the Pythagorean theorem. The description of this diagram appears in verse 129 of Bijaganita of Bhaskara II. There is a legend that Bhaskara's proof of the Pythagorean theorem consisted of only just one word, namely, "Behold!". However, the theorem follows from relating the area of the interior (smaller) square to that of the larger square formed by the edges of four triangles. Thus, using the notations of the diagram, the following equation results:

$$c^2=(a-b)^2+4(\tfrac{1}{2}ab)=(a^2-2ab+b^2)+(2ab)=a^2+b^2.$$

== See also ==
- Hsuan thu
