= Proportion (mathematics) =

Statement in mathematics

A proportion is a mathematical statement expressing equality of two ratios.

$a:b=c:d$

a and d are called extremes, b and c are called means.

Proportion can be written as $\frac{a}{b}=\frac{c}{d}$, where ratios are expressed as fractions.

Such a proportion is known as geometrical proportion, not to be confused with arithmetical proportion and harmonic proportion.

== Properties of proportions ==
- Fundamental rule of proportion. This rule is sometimes called Means‐Extremes Property. If the ratios are expressed as fractions, then the same rule can be phrased in terms of the equality of "cross-products" and is called Cross‐Products Property.

If $\ \frac ab=\frac cd$, then $\ ad=bc$

- If $\ \frac ab=\frac cd$, then $\ \frac ba=\frac dc$
- If $\ \frac ab=\frac cd$, then

$$\ \frac ac=\frac bd$$,
$$\ \frac db=\frac ca$$.

- If $\ \frac ab=\frac cd$, then

$$\ \dfrac{a+b}{b}=\dfrac{c+d}{d}$$,
$$\ \dfrac{a-b}{b}=\dfrac{c-d}{d}$$.

- If $\ \frac ab=\frac cd$, then

$$\ \dfrac{a+c}{b+d}=\frac ab =\frac cd$$,
$$\ \dfrac{a-c}{b-d}=\frac ab =\frac cd$$.

== History ==
A Greek mathematician Eudoxus provided a definition for the meaning of the equality between two ratios. This definition of proportion forms the subject of Euclid's Book V, where we can read:

Magnitudes are said to be in the same ratio, the first to the second and the third to the fourth when, if any equimultiples whatever be taken of the first and third, and any equimultiples whatever of the second and fourth, the former equimultiples alike exceed, are alike equal to, or alike fall short of, the latter equimultiples respectively taken in corresponding order.

Later, the realization that ratios are numbers allowed to switch from solving proportions to equations, and from transformation of proportions to algebraic transformations.

== Related concepts ==
=== Arithmetic proportion ===
An equation of the form $a-b = c-d$ is called arithmetic proportion or difference proportion.

=== Harmonic proportion ===
If the means of the geometric proportion are equal, and the rightmost extreme is equal to the difference between the leftmost extreme and a mean, then such a proportion is called harmonic: $a : b = b : (a - b)$. In this case the ratio $a : b$ is called golden ratio.

== See also ==
- Ratio
- Proportionality
- Correlation
