= Theomedon =

Ancient Greek physician

Theomedon (Greek: Θεομέδων) was a very wealthy Ancient Greek physician. Today he is famous for his many collaborations with Eudoxus of Cnidus with whom shared several journeys and scientific endeavours.

== Life ==
He flourished in about the middle of the third century B.C.

== Career ==
He was a companion of Eudoxus of Cnidus and he accompanied him on several journeys and collaborated with him on several works.

It has claimed by some historians that it was Theomedon who paid for the expenses of Eudoxus of Cnidus to go to Athens for studies at Plato's Academy, which was founded in 387 BC.

== See also ==
- Ancient Greek literature
- Sapphic stanza
- Papyrus Oxyrhynchus 7 – papyrus preserving Sappho fr. 5
- Papyrus Oxyrhynchus 1231 – papyrus preserving Sappho fr. 15–30
