= Wilbur Knorr =

American historian of mathematics (1945–1997)

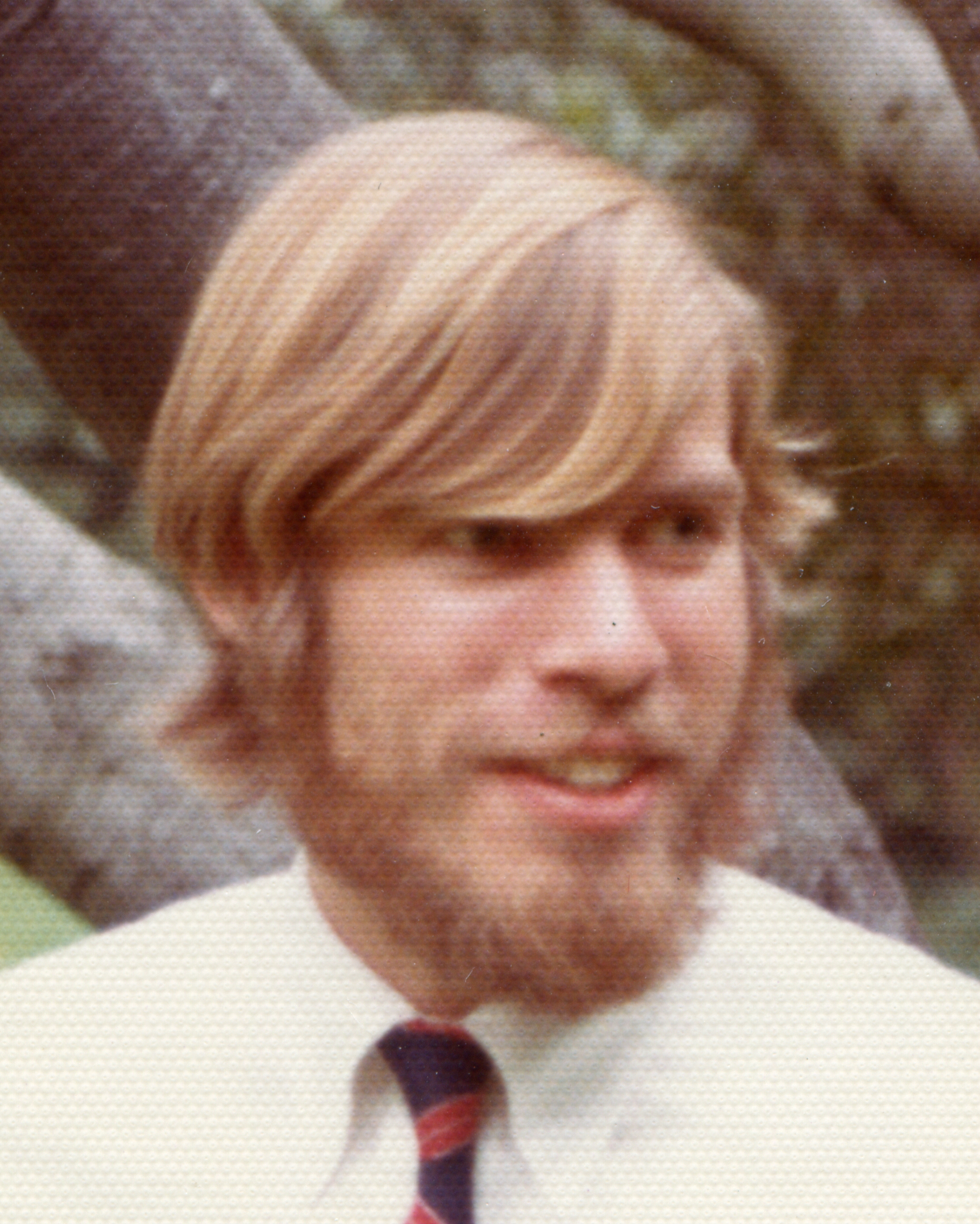
- Knorr in 1973
- Born: Wilbur Richard Knorr; August 29, 1945; New York City, US
- Died: March 18, 1997 (aged 51); Palo Alto, California, US
- Occupation: Historian of mathematics

Academic background
- Education: Harvard University (PhD)
- Doctoral advisor: John E. Murdoch, G. E. L. Owen

Academic work
- Discipline: History of mathematics
- Sub-discipline: Ancient Greek mathematics
- Institutions: Stanford University (1979–1997)

Wilbur Richard Knorr (August 29, 1945 – March 18, 1997) was an American historian of mathematics and a professor in the departments of philosophy and classics at Stanford University. He has been called "one of the most profound and certainly the most provocative historian of Greek mathematics" of the 20th century.

== Biography ==
Knorr was born August 29, 1945, in Richmond Hill, Queens. He did his undergraduate studies at Harvard University from 1963 to 1966 and stayed there for his Ph.D., which he received in 1973 under the supervision of John Emery Murdoch and G. E. L. Owen. After postdoctoral studies at Cambridge University, he taught at Brooklyn College, but lost his position when the college's Downtown Brooklyn campus was closed as part of New York's mid-1970s fiscal crisis. After taking a temporary position at the Institute for Advanced Study, he joined the Stanford faculty as an assistant professor in 1979, was tenured there in 1983, and was promoted to full professor in 1990.

He died March 18, 1997, in Palo Alto, California, of melanoma.

Knorr was a talented violinist, and played first violin in the Harvard Orchestra, but he gave up his music when he came to Stanford, as the pressures of the tenure process did not allow him adequate practice time.

== Books ==
- The Evolution of the Euclidean Elements: A Study of the Theory of Incommensurable Magnitudes and Its Significance for Early Greek Geometry.

This work incorporates Knorr's Ph.D. thesis. It traces the early history of irrational numbers from their first discovery (in Thebes between 430 and 410 BC, Knorr speculates), through the work of Theodorus of Cyrene, who showed the irrationality of the square roots of the integers up to 17, and Theodorus' student Theaetetus, who showed that all non-square integers have irrational square roots. Knorr reconstructs an argument based on Pythagorean triples and parity that matches the story in Plato's Theaetetus of Theodorus' difficulties with the number 17, and shows that switching from parity to a different dichotomy in terms of whether a number is square or not was the key to Theaetetus' success. Theaetetus classified the known irrational numbers into three types, based on analogies to the geometric mean, arithmetic mean, and harmonic mean, and this classification was then greatly extended by Eudoxus of Cnidus; Knorr speculates that this extension stemmed out of Eudoxus' studies of the golden section.
Along with this history of irrational numbers, Knorr reaches several conclusions about the history of Euclid's Elements and of other related mathematical documents; in particular, he ascribes the origin of the material in Books 1, 3, and 6 of the Elements to the time of Hippocrates of Chios, and of the material in books 2, 4, 10, and 13 to the later period of Theodorus, Theaetetus, and Eudoxos. However, this suggested history has been criticized by van der Waerden, who believed that books 1 through 4 were largely due to the much earlier Pythagorean school.

- Ancient Sources of the Medieval Tradition of Mechanics: Greek, Arabic, and Latin studies of the balance.
- The Ancient Tradition of Geometric Problems.

This book, aimed at a general audience, examines the history of three classical problems from Greek mathematics: doubling the cube, squaring the circle, and angle trisection. It is now known that none of these problems can be solved by compass and straightedge, but Knorr argues that emphasizing these impossibility results is an anachronism due in part to the foundational crisis in 1930s mathematics. Instead, Knorr argues, the Greek mathematicians were primarily interested in how to solve these problems by whatever means they could, and viewed theorem and proofs as tools for problem-solving more than as ends in their own right.

- Textual Studies in Ancient and Medieval Geometry.

This is a longer and more technical "appendix" to The Ancient Tradition of Geometric Problems in which Knorr examines the similarities and differences between ancient mathematical texts carefully in order to determine how they influenced each other and untangle their editorial history. One of Knorr's more provocative speculations in this work is that Hypatia may have played a role in editing Archimedes' Measurement of a Circle.
