= Xuan tu =

Ancient Chinese proof of the Pythagorean theorem

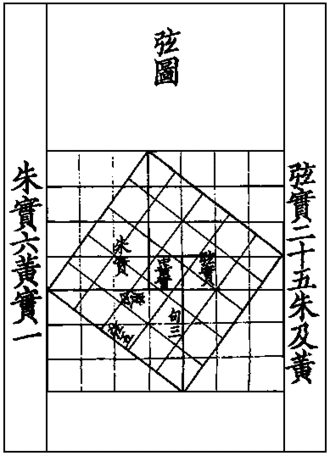
Xuan tu (Hsuan thu)

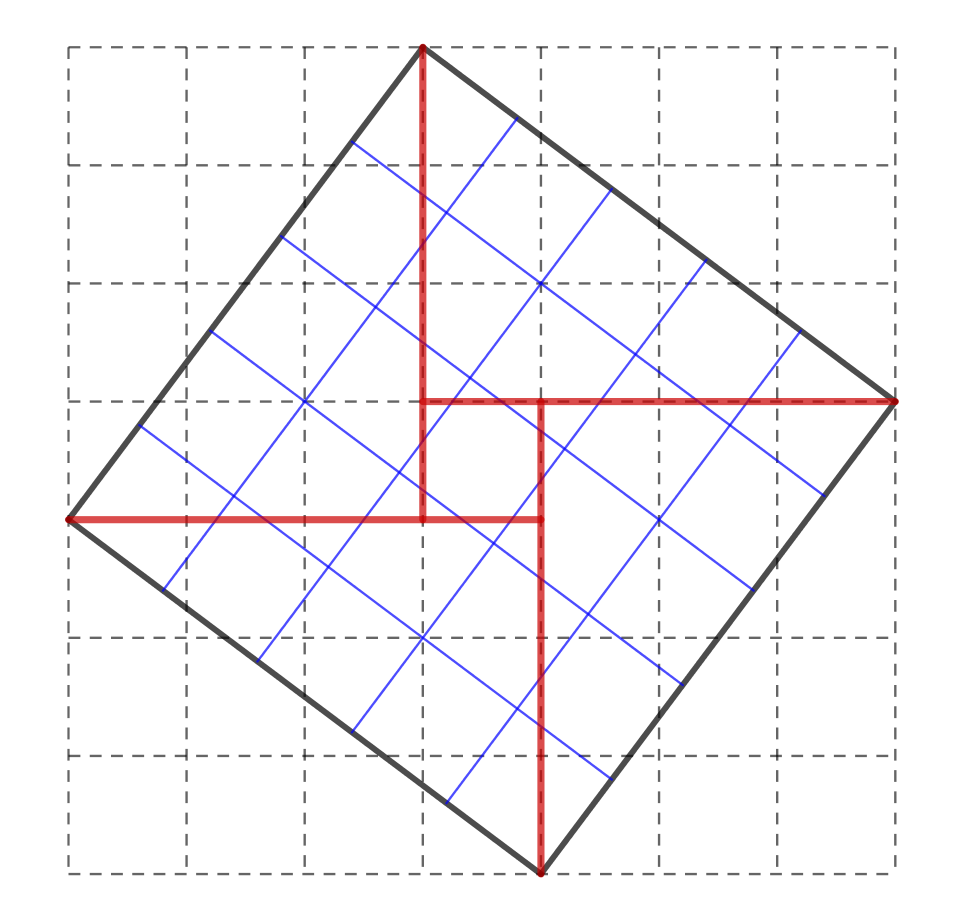
Xuan tu diagram without the Chinese characters

Xuan tu or Hsuan thu (simplified Chinese: 弦图; traditional Chinese: 絃圖; pinyin: xuántú; Wade–Giles: hsüan² tʻu²) is a diagram given in the ancient Chinese astronomical and mathematical text Zhoubi Suanjing indicating a proof of the Pythagorean theorem. Zhoubi Suanjing is one of the oldest Chinese texts on mathematics. The exact date of composition of the book has not been determined. Some estimates of the date range as far back as 1100 BCE, while others estimate the date as late as 200 CE. However, from astronomical evidence available in the book it would appear that much of the material in the book is from the time of Confucius, that is, the 6th century BCE. Hsuan thu represents one of the earliest known proofs of the Pythagorean theorem and also one of the simplest. The text in Zhoubi Suanjing accompanying the diagram has been translated as follows:

The art of numbering proceeds from the circle and the square. The circle is derived from the square and the square from the rectangle (literally, the T-square or the carpenter's square). The rectangle originates from the fact that 9x9 = 81 (that is, the multiplication table or properties of numbers as such). Thus, let us cut a rectangle (diagonally) and make the width 3 (units) wide and the height 4 (units) long. The diagonal between the two corners will then be 5 (units) long. Now after drawing a square on the diagonal, circumscribe it by half-rectangles like that which has been left outside, so as to form a (square) plate. Thus the (four) outer half-rectangles of width 3, length 4 and diagonal 5, together make two rectangles (of area 24); then (when this is subtracted from the square plate of area 24) the remainder is of area 25. This (process) is called "piling up the rectangles" (chi chu).

The hsuan thu diagram makes use of the 3,4,5 right triangle to demonstrate the Pythagorean theorem. However the Chinese people seem to have generalized its conclusion to all right triangles.

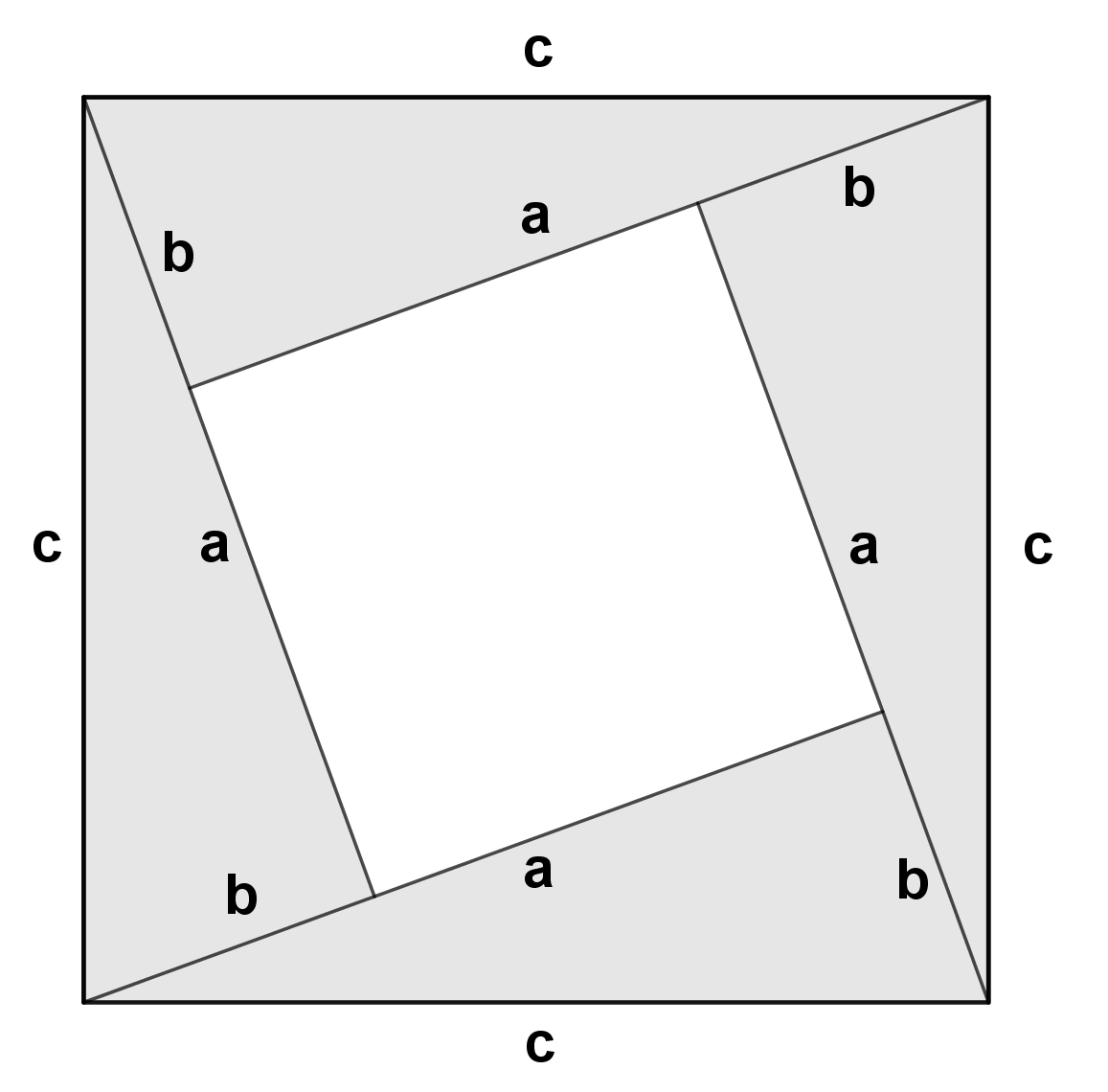
Diagram illustrating Bhaskara II's proof of Pythagorean theorem

The hsuan thu diagram, in its generalized form can be found in the writings of the Indian mathematician Bhaskara II (c. 1114–1185). The description of this diagram appears in verse 129 of Bijaganita of Bhaskara II. There is a legend that Bhaskara's proof of the Pythagorean theorem consisted of only just one word, namely, "Behold!". However, using the notations of the diagram, the theorem follows from the following equation:

$$c^2=(a-b)^2+4(\tfrac{1}{2}ab)=a^2+b^2.$$
