= The Ancient Tradition of Geometric Problems =

1986 book on ancient Greek mathematics by Wilbur Knorr

- 1993 edition cover
- Author: Wilbur Knorr
- Genre: Mathematics
- Publisher: Birkhäuser
- Publication date: 1986

The Ancient Tradition of Geometric Problems is a book on ancient Greek mathematics, focusing on three problems now known to be impossible if one uses only the straightedge and compass constructions favored by the Greek mathematicians: squaring the circle, doubling the cube, and trisecting the angle. It was written by Wilbur Knorr (1945–1997), a historian of mathematics, and published in 1986 by Birkhäuser. Dover Publications reprinted it in 1993.

== Topics ==
The Ancient Tradition of Geometric Problems studies the three classical problems of circle-squaring, cube-doubling, and angle trisection throughout the history of Greek mathematics, also considering several other problems studied by the Greeks in which a geometric object with certain properties is to be constructed, in many cases through transformations to other construction problems. The study runs from Plato and the story of the Delian oracle to the second century BC, when Archimedes and Apollonius of Perga flourished; Knorr suggests that the decline in Greek geometry after that time represented a shift in interest to other topics in mathematics rather than a decline in mathematics as a whole. Unlike the earlier work on this material by Thomas Heath, Knorr sticks to the source material as it is, reconstructing the motivation and lines of reasoning followed by the Greek mathematicians and their connections to each other, rather than adding justifications for the correctness of the constructions based on modern mathematical techniques.

In modern times, the impossibility of solving the three classical problems by straightedge and compass, finally proven in the 19th century, has often been viewed as analogous to the foundational crisis of mathematics of the early 20th century, in which David Hilbert's program of reducing mathematics to a system of axioms and calculational rules struggled against logical inconsistencies in its axiom systems, intuitionist rejection of formalism and dualism, and Gödel's incompleteness theorems showing that no such axiom system could formalize all mathematical truths and remain consistent. However, Knorr argues in The Ancient Tradition of Geometric Problems that this point of view is anachronistic, and that the Greek mathematicians themselves were more interested in finding and classifying the mathematical tools that could solve these problems than they were in imposing artificial limitations on themselves and in the philosophical consequences of these limitations.

When a geometric construction problem does not admit a compass-and-straightedge solution, then either the constraints on the problem or on the solution techniques can be relaxed, and Knorr argues that the Greeks did both. Constructions described by the book include the solution by Menaechmus of doubling the cube by finding the intersection points of two conic sections, several neusis constructions involving fitting a segment of a given length between two points or curves, and the use of the Quadratrix of Hippias for trisecting angles and squaring circles. Some specific theories on the authorship of Greek mathematics, put forward by the book, include the legitimacy of a letter on square-doubling from Eratosthenes to Ptolemy III Euergetes, a distinction between Socratic-era sophist Hippias and the Hippias who invented the quadratrix, and a similar distinction between Aristaeus the Elder, a mathematician of the time of Euclid, and the Aristaeus who authored a book on solids (mentioned by Pappus of Alexandria), and whom Knorr places at the time of Apollonius.

The book is heavily illustrated, and many endnotes provide sources for quotations, additional discussion, and references to related research.

== Audience and reception ==
The book is written for a general audience, unlike a follow-up work published by Knorr, Textual Studies in Ancient and Medieval Geometry (1989), which is aimed at other experts in the close reading of Greek mathematical texts. Nevertheless, reviewer Alan Stenger calls The Ancient Tradition of Geometric Problems "very specialized and scholarly". Reviewer Colin R. Fletcher calls it "essential reading" for understanding the background and content of the Greek mathematical problem-solving tradition. In its historical scholarship, historian of mathematics Tom Whiteside writes that the book's occasionally speculative nature is justified by its fresh interpretations, well-founded conjectures, and deep knowledge of the subject.
