= Commensurability (mathematics) =

When two functions have co-rational periods, i.e. n T1 = m T2

In mathematics, two non-zero real numbers a and b are said to be commensurable if their ratio a/b is a rational number; otherwise a and b are called incommensurable. (Recall that a rational number is one that is equivalent to the ratio of two integers.) There is a more general notion of commensurability in group theory.

For example, the numbers 3 and 2 are commensurable because their ratio, 3/2, is a rational number. The numbers $\sqrt{3}$ and $2\sqrt{3}$ are also commensurable because their ratio, $\frac{\sqrt{3}}{2\sqrt{3}}=\frac{1}{2}$, is a rational number. However, the numbers $\sqrt{3}$ and 2 are incommensurable because their ratio, $\frac{\sqrt{3}}{2}$, is an irrational number.

More generally, it is immediate from the definition that if a and b are any two non-zero rational numbers, then a and b are commensurable; it is also immediate that if a is any irrational number and b is any non-zero rational number, then a and b are incommensurable. On the other hand, if both a and b are irrational numbers, then a and b may or may not be commensurable.

== History of the concept ==
The Pythagoreans are credited with the proof of the existence of irrational numbers. When the ratio of the lengths of two line segments is irrational, the line segments themselves (not just their lengths) are also described as being incommensurable.

A separate, more general and circuitous ancient Greek doctrine of proportionality for geometric magnitude was developed in Book V of Euclid's Elements in order to allow proofs involving incommensurable lengths, thus avoiding arguments which applied only to a historically restricted definition of number.

Euclid's notion of commensurability is anticipated in passing in the discussion between Socrates and the slave boy in Plato's dialogue entitled Meno, in which Socrates uses the boy's own inherent capabilities to solve a complex geometric problem through the Socratic Method. He develops a proof which is, for all intents and purposes, very Euclidean in nature and speaks to the concept of incommensurability.

The usage primarily comes from translations of Euclid's Elements, in which two line segments a and b are called commensurable precisely if there is some third segment c that can be laid end-to-end a whole number of times to produce a segment congruent to a, and also, with a different whole number, a segment congruent to b. Euclid did not use any concept of real number, but he used a notion of congruence of line segments, and of one such segment being longer or shorter than another.

That a/b is rational is a necessary and sufficient condition for the existence of some real number c, and integers m and n, such that

a = mc and b = nc.

Assuming for simplicity that a and b are positive, one can say that a ruler, marked off in units of length c, could be used to measure out both a line segment of length a, and one of length b. That is, there is a common unit of length in terms of which a and b can both be measured; this is the origin of the term. Otherwise the pair a and b are incommensurable.

== In group theory ==
In group theory, two subgroups Γ_{1} and Γ_{2} of a group G are said to be commensurable if the intersection Γ_{1} ∩ Γ_{2} is of finite index in both Γ_{1} and Γ_{2}.

Example: Let a and b be nonzero real numbers. Then the subgroup of the real numbers R generated by a is commensurable with the subgroup generated by b if and only if the real numbers a and b are commensurable, in the sense that a/b is rational. Thus the group-theoretic notion of commensurability generalizes the concept for real numbers.

There is a similar notion for two groups which are not given as subgroups of the same group. Two groups G_{1} and G_{2} are (abstractly) commensurable if there are subgroups H_{1} ⊂ G_{1} and H_{2} ⊂ G_{2} of finite index such that H_{1} is isomorphic to H_{2}.

== In topology ==
Two path-connected topological spaces are sometimes said to be commensurable if they have homeomorphic finite-sheeted covering spaces. Depending on the type of space under consideration, one might want to use homotopy equivalences or diffeomorphisms instead of homeomorphisms in the definition. If two spaces are commensurable, then their fundamental groups are commensurable.

Example: any two closed surfaces of genus at least 2 are commensurable with each other.
