= Pegasus in Chinese astronomy =

Constellation in Chinese uranography

According to traditional Chinese uranography, the modern constellation Pegasus is located within the northern quadrant of the sky, which is symbolized as the Black Tortoise of the North (北方玄武, Běi Fāng Xuán Wǔ).

The name of the western constellation in modern Chinese is 飛馬座 (fēi mǎ zuò), meaning "the flying horse constellation".

== Stars ==
The map of Chinese constellation in constellation Pegasus area consists of:

Four Symbols	Mansion (Chinese name)	Romanization	Translation	Asterisms (Chinese name)	Romanization	Translation	Western star name	Proper Name	Chinese star name	Romanization	Translation
Black Tortoise of the North (北方玄武)	虚	Xū	Emptiness								
Black Tortoise of the North (北方玄武)	虚	Xū	Emptiness	司祿	Sīlù	Deified Judge of Rank	11 Peg		司祿一	Sīlùyī	1st star
Black Tortoise of the North (北方玄武)	危	Wēi	Rooftop	危	Wēi	Rooftop					
Black Tortoise of the North (北方玄武)	危	Wēi	Rooftop	危	Wēi	Rooftop	θ Peg	Biham	危宿二	Wēisùèr	2nd star
Black Tortoise of the North (北方玄武)	危	Wēi	Rooftop	危	Wēi	Rooftop	ε Peg	Enif			
Black Tortoise of the North (北方玄武)	危	Wēi	Rooftop	危	Wēi	Rooftop	ε Peg	Enif	危宿三	Wēisùsān	3rd star
Black Tortoise of the North (北方玄武)	危	Wēi	Rooftop	危	Wēi	Rooftop	ε Peg	Enif	危宿北星	Wēisùběixīng	Northern star
Black Tortoise of the North (北方玄武)	危	Wēi	Rooftop	危	Wēi	Rooftop	3 Peg		危宿增一	Wēisùzēngyī	1st additional star
Black Tortoise of the North (北方玄武)	危	Wēi	Rooftop	危	Wēi	Rooftop	4 Peg		危宿增二	Wēisùzēngèr	2nd additional star
Black Tortoise of the North (北方玄武)	危	Wēi	Rooftop	危	Wēi	Rooftop	7 Peg		危宿增三	Wēisùzēngsān	3rd additional star
Black Tortoise of the North (北方玄武)	危	Wēi	Rooftop	危	Wēi	Rooftop	30 Peg		危宿增五	Wēisùzēngwǔ	5th additional star
Black Tortoise of the North (北方玄武)	危	Wēi	Rooftop	危	Wēi	Rooftop	18 Peg		危宿增七	Wēisùzēngqī	7th additional star
Black Tortoise of the North (北方玄武)	危	Wēi	Rooftop	危	Wēi	Rooftop	19 Peg		危宿增八	Wēisùzēngbā	8th additional star
Black Tortoise of the North (北方玄武)	危	Wēi	Rooftop	危	Wēi	Rooftop	21 Peg		危宿增九	Wēisùzēngjiǔ	9th additional star
Black Tortoise of the North (北方玄武)	危	Wēi	Rooftop	危	Wēi	Rooftop	20 Peg		危宿增十	Wēisùzēngshí	10th additional star
Black Tortoise of the North (北方玄武)	危	Wēi	Rooftop	危	Wēi	Rooftop	17 Peg		危宿增十一	Wēisùzēngshíyī	11th additional star
Black Tortoise of the North (北方玄武)	危	Wēi	Rooftop	危	Wēi	Rooftop	HD 208189		危宿增二	Wēisùzēngshíèr	12th additional star
Black Tortoise of the North (北方玄武)	危	Wēi	Rooftop	危	Wēi	Rooftop	HD 209288		危宿增四	Wēisùzēngshísì	14th additional star
Black Tortoise of the North (北方玄武)	危	Wēi	Rooftop	墳墓	Fénmù	Tomb					
Black Tortoise of the North (北方玄武)	危	Wēi	Rooftop	墳墓	Fénmù	Tomb	34 Peg		墳墓增一	Fénmùzēngyī	1st additional star
Black Tortoise of the North (北方玄武)	危	Wēi	Rooftop	墳墓	Fénmù	Tomb	35 Peg		墳墓增二	Fénmùzēngèr	2nd additional star
Black Tortoise of the North (北方玄武)	危	Wēi	Rooftop	墳墓	Fénmù	Tomb	37 Peg		墳墓增三	Fénmùzēngsān	3rd additional star
Black Tortoise of the North (北方玄武)	危	Wēi	Rooftop	人	Rén	Humans					
Black Tortoise of the North (北方玄武)	危	Wēi	Rooftop	人	Rén	Humans	2 Peg		人一	Rényī	1st star
Black Tortoise of the North (北方玄武)	危	Wēi	Rooftop	人	Rén	Humans	1 Peg		人二	Rénèr	2nd star
Black Tortoise of the North (北方玄武)	危	Wēi	Rooftop	人	Rén	Humans	9 Peg		人三	Rénsān	3rd star
Black Tortoise of the North (北方玄武)	危	Wēi	Rooftop	人	Rén	Humans	12 Peg		人四	Rénsì	4th star
Black Tortoise of the North (北方玄武)	危	Wēi	Rooftop	人	Rén	Humans	5 Peg		人墓三	Rénmùsān	3rd additional star
Black Tortoise of the North (北方玄武)	危	Wēi	Rooftop	人	Rén	Humans	13 Peg		人墓四	Rénmùsì	4th additional star
Black Tortoise of the North (北方玄武)	危	Wēi	Rooftop	杵	Chǔ	Pestle					
Black Tortoise of the North (北方玄武)	危	Wēi	Rooftop	杵	Chǔ	Pestle	π^{2} Peg	Neichu	杵二	Chǔèr	2nd star
Black Tortoise of the North (北方玄武)	危	Wēi	Rooftop	杵	Chǔ	Pestle	23 Peg		杵三	Chǔsān	3rd star
Black Tortoise of the North (北方玄武)	危	Wēi	Rooftop	杵	Chǔ	Pestle	π^{1} Peg		杵增一	Chǔzēngyī	1st additional star
Black Tortoise of the North (北方玄武)	危	Wēi	Rooftop	杵	Chǔ	Pestle	38 Peg		杵增二	Chǔzēngèr	2nd additional star
Black Tortoise of the North (北方玄武)	危	Wēi	Rooftop	臼	Jiù	Mortar					
Black Tortoise of the North (北方玄武)	危	Wēi	Rooftop	臼	Jiù	Mortar	κ Peg		臼二	Jiùèr	2nd star
Black Tortoise of the North (北方玄武)	危	Wēi	Rooftop	臼	Jiù	Mortar	ι Peg	Jiu	臼三	Jiùsān	3rd star
Black Tortoise of the North (北方玄武)	危	Wēi	Rooftop	臼	Jiù	Mortar	32 Peg		臼四	Jiùsì	4th star
Black Tortoise of the North (北方玄武)	危	Wēi	Rooftop	臼	Jiù	Mortar	14 Peg		臼增一	Jiùzēngyī	1st additional star
Black Tortoise of the North (北方玄武)	危	Wēi	Rooftop	臼	Jiù	Mortar	15 Peg		臼增二	Jiùzēngèr	2nd additional star
Black Tortoise of the North (北方玄武)	危	Wēi	Rooftop	臼	Jiù	Mortar	16 Peg		臼增三	Jiùzēngsān	3rd additional star
Black Tortoise of the North (北方玄武)	危	Wēi	Rooftop	臼	Jiù	Mortar	25 Peg		臼增四	Jiùzēngsì	4th additional star
Black Tortoise of the North (北方玄武)	危	Wēi	Rooftop	臼	Jiù	Mortar	28 Peg		臼增五	Jiùzēngwǔ	5th additional star
Black Tortoise of the North (北方玄武)	危	Wēi	Rooftop	臼	Jiù	Mortar	HD 210210		臼增六	Jiùzēngliù	6th additional star
Black Tortoise of the North (北方玄武)	室	Shì	Encampment	室	Shì	Encampment					
Black Tortoise of the North (北方玄武)	室	Shì	Encampment	室	Shì	Encampment	α Peg	Markab			
Black Tortoise of the North (北方玄武)	室	Shì	Encampment	室	Shì	Encampment	α Peg	Markab	室宿一	Shìsùyī	1st star
Black Tortoise of the North (北方玄武)	室	Shì	Encampment	室	Shì	Encampment	α Peg	Markab	室宿距星	Shìsùjùxīng	Separated star
Black Tortoise of the North (北方玄武)	室	Shì	Encampment	室	Shì	Encampment	α Peg	Markab	室宿南星	Shìsùnánxīng	Southern star
Black Tortoise of the North (北方玄武)	室	Shì	Encampment	室	Shì	Encampment	α Peg	Markab	定星	Dìngxīng	Fixed star
Black Tortoise of the North (北方玄武)	室	Shì	Encampment	室	Shì	Encampment	α Peg	Markab	營星	Yíngxīng	Star of army / camp
Black Tortoise of the North (北方玄武)	室	Shì	Encampment	室	Shì	Encampment	α Peg	Markab	清廟	Qīngmiào	Qing temple
Black Tortoise of the North (北方玄武)	室	Shì	Encampment	室	Shì	Encampment	β Peg	Scheat			
Black Tortoise of the North (北方玄武)	室	Shì	Encampment	室	Shì	Encampment	β Peg	Scheat	室宿二	Shìsùèr	2nd star
Black Tortoise of the North (北方玄武)	室	Shì	Encampment	室	Shì	Encampment	β Peg	Scheat	室宿北星	Shìsùběixīng	Northern star
Black Tortoise of the North (北方玄武)	室	Shì	Encampment	室	Shì	Encampment	β Peg	Scheat	玄宮	Xuángōng	Black / mysterious palace
Black Tortoise of the North (北方玄武)	室	Shì	Encampment	室	Shì	Encampment	51 Peg	Helvetios	室宿增一	Shìsùzēngyī	1st additional star
Black Tortoise of the North (北方玄武)	室	Shì	Encampment	室	Shì	Encampment	56 Peg		室宿增二	Shìsùzēngèr	2nd additional star
Black Tortoise of the North (北方玄武)	室	Shì	Encampment	室	Shì	Encampment	60 Peg		室宿增三	Shìsùzēngsān	3rd additional star
Black Tortoise of the North (北方玄武)	室	Shì	Encampment	室	Shì	Encampment	61 Peg		室宿增四	Shìsùzēngsì	4th additional star
Black Tortoise of the North (北方玄武)	室	Shì	Encampment	室	Shì	Encampment	63 Peg		室宿增五	Shìsùzēngwǔ	5th additional star
Black Tortoise of the North (北方玄武)	室	Shì	Encampment	室	Shì	Encampment	64 Peg		室宿增六	Shìsùzēngliù	6th additional star
Black Tortoise of the North (北方玄武)	室	Shì	Encampment	室	Shì	Encampment	67 Peg		室宿增七	Shìsùzēngqī	7th additional star
Black Tortoise of the North (北方玄武)	室	Shì	Encampment	離宮	Lígōng	Resting Palace					
Black Tortoise of the North (北方玄武)	室	Shì	Encampment	離宮	Lígōng	Resting Palace	λ Peg	Ligong	離宮一	Lígōngyī	1st star
Black Tortoise of the North (北方玄武)	室	Shì	Encampment	離宮	Lígōng	Resting Palace	μ Peg	Sadarbari	離宮二	Lígōngèr	2nd star
Black Tortoise of the North (北方玄武)	室	Shì	Encampment	離宮	Lígōng	Resting Palace	ο Peg		離宮三	Lígōngsān	3rd star
Black Tortoise of the North (北方玄武)	室	Shì	Encampment	離宮	Lígōng	Resting Palace	η Peg	Matar			
Black Tortoise of the North (北方玄武)	室	Shì	Encampment	離宮	Lígōng	Resting Palace	η Peg	Matar	離宮四	Lígōngsì	4th star
Black Tortoise of the North (北方玄武)	室	Shì	Encampment	離宮	Lígōng	Resting Palace	η Peg	Matar	離宮西北第二星	Lígōngxīběidìxīng	Second northwestern star
Black Tortoise of the North (北方玄武)	室	Shì	Encampment	離宮	Lígōng	Resting Palace	τ Peg	Salm	離宮五	Lígōngwǔ	5th star
Black Tortoise of the North (北方玄武)	室	Shì	Encampment	離宮	Lígōng	Resting Palace	υ Peg	Alkarab	離宮六	Lígōngliù	6th star
Black Tortoise of the North (北方玄武)	室	Shì	Encampment	離宮	Lígōng	Resting Palace	33 Peg		离宫增一	Lígōngzēngyī	1st additional star
Black Tortoise of the North (北方玄武)	室	Shì	Encampment	離宮	Lígōng	Resting Palace	39 Peg		离宫增二	Lígōngzēngèr	2nd additional star
Black Tortoise of the North (北方玄武)	室	Shì	Encampment	離宮	Lígōng	Resting Palace	40 Peg		离宫增三	Lígōngzēngsān	3rd additional star
Black Tortoise of the North (北方玄武)	室	Shì	Encampment	離宮	Lígōng	Resting Palace	41 Peg		离宫增四	Lígōngzēngsì	4th additional star
Black Tortoise of the North (北方玄武)	室	Shì	Encampment	離宮	Lígōng	Resting Palace	45 Peg		离宫增五	Lígōngzēngwǔ	5th additional star
Black Tortoise of the North (北方玄武)	室	Shì	Encampment	離宮	Lígōng	Resting Palace	65 Peg		离宫增六	Lígōngzēngliù	6th additional star
Black Tortoise of the North (北方玄武)	室	Shì	Encampment	離宮	Lígōng	Resting Palace	71 Peg		离宫增七	Lígōngzēngqī	7th additional star
Black Tortoise of the North (北方玄武)	室	Shì	Encampment	離宮	Lígōng	Resting Palace	69 Peg		离宫增八	Lígōngzēngbā	8th additional star
Black Tortoise of the North (北方玄武)	室	Shì	Encampment	雷電	Léidiàn	Thunder and Lightning					
Black Tortoise of the North (北方玄武)	室	Shì	Encampment	雷電	Léidiàn	Thunder and Lightning	ζ Peg	Homam	雷電一	Léidiànyī	1st star
Black Tortoise of the North (北方玄武)	室	Shì	Encampment	雷電	Léidiàn	Thunder and Lightning	ξ Peg	Tugongli	雷電二	Léidiànèr	2nd star
Black Tortoise of the North (北方玄武)	室	Shì	Encampment	雷電	Léidiàn	Thunder and Lightning	σ Peg		雷電三	Léidiànsān	3rd star
Black Tortoise of the North (北方玄武)	室	Shì	Encampment	雷電	Léidiàn	Thunder and Lightning	55 Peg		雷電四	Léidiànsì	4th star
Black Tortoise of the North (北方玄武)	室	Shì	Encampment	雷電	Léidiàn	Thunder and Lightning	66 Peg		雷電五	Léidiànwu	5th star
Black Tortoise of the North (北方玄武)	室	Shì	Encampment	雷電	Léidiàn	Thunder and Lightning	70 Peg		雷電六	Léidiànliù	6th star
Black Tortoise of the North (北方玄武)	室	Shì	Encampment	雷電	Léidiàn	Thunder and Lightning	52 Peg		雷電增一	Léidiànzēngyī	1st additional star
Black Tortoise of the North (北方玄武)	室	Shì	Encampment	雷電	Léidiàn	Thunder and Lightning	ρ Peg	Leidian	雷電增二	Léidiànzēngèr	2nd additional star
Black Tortoise of the North (北方玄武)	室	Shì	Encampment	雷電	Léidiàn	Thunder and Lightning	57 Peg		雷電增三	Léidiànzēngsān	3rd additional star
Black Tortoise of the North (北方玄武)	室	Shì	Encampment	雷電	Léidiàn	Thunder and Lightning	59 Peg		雷電增四	Léidiànzēngsì	4th additional star
Black Tortoise of the North (北方玄武)	室	Shì	Encampment	雷電	Léidiàn	Thunder and Lightning	58 Peg		雷電增五	Léidiànzēngwǔ	5th additional star
Black Tortoise of the North (北方玄武)	室	Shì	Encampment	雷電	Léidiàn	Thunder and Lightning	66 Peg		雷電增六	Léidiànzēngliù	6th additional star
Black Tortoise of the North (北方玄武)	室	Shì	Encampment	雷電	Léidiàn	Thunder and Lightning	75 Peg		雷電增七	Léidiànzēngqī	7th additional star
Black Tortoise of the North (北方玄武)	室	Shì	Encampment	雷電	Léidiàn	Thunder and Lightning	76 Peg		雷電增八	Léidiànzēngbā	8th additional star
Black Tortoise of the North (北方玄武)	室	Shì	Encampment	土公吏	Tǔgōnglì	Official for Materials Supply					
Black Tortoise of the North (北方玄武)	室	Shì	Encampment	土公吏	Tǔgōnglì	Official for Materials Supply	31 Peg		土公吏一	Tǔgōnglìyī	1st star
Black Tortoise of the North (北方玄武)	室	Shì	Encampment	土公吏	Tǔgōnglì	Official for Materials Supply	36 Peg		土公吏二	Tǔgōnglìèr	2nd star
Black Tortoise of the North (北方玄武)	壁	Bì	Wall	壁	Bì	Wall					
Black Tortoise of the North (北方玄武)	壁	Bì	Wall	壁	Bì	Wall	γ Peg	Algenib			
Black Tortoise of the North (北方玄武)	壁	Bì	Wall	壁	Bì	Wall	γ Peg	Algenib	壁宿一	Bìsùyī	1st star
Black Tortoise of the North (北方玄武)	壁	Bì	Wall	壁	Bì	Wall	γ Peg	Algenib	壁宿距星	Bìsùjùxīng	Separated star
Black Tortoise of the North (北方玄武)	壁	Bì	Wall	壁	Bì	Wall	γ Peg	Algenib	壁宿南星	Bìsùnánxīng	Northern star
Black Tortoise of the North (北方玄武)	壁	Bì	Wall	壁	Bì	Wall	73 Peg		壁宿增一	Bìsùzēngyī	1st additional star
Black Tortoise of the North (北方玄武)	壁	Bì	Wall	壁	Bì	Wall	72 Peg		壁宿增二	Bìsùzēngèr	2nd additional star
Black Tortoise of the North (北方玄武)	壁	Bì	Wall	壁	Bì	Wall	78 Peg		壁宿增三	Bìsùzēngsān	3rd additional star
Black Tortoise of the North (北方玄武)	壁	Bì	Wall	壁	Bì	Wall	79 Peg		壁宿增四	Bìsùzēngsì	4th additional star
Black Tortoise of the North (北方玄武)	壁	Bì	Wall	壁	Bì	Wall	85 Peg		壁宿增五	Bìsùzēngwǔ	5th additional star
Black Tortoise of the North (北方玄武)	壁	Bì	Wall	壁	Bì	Wall	ψ Peg		壁宿增六	Bìsùzēngliù	6th additional star
Black Tortoise of the North (北方玄武)	壁	Bì	Wall	壁	Bì	Wall	83 Peg		壁宿增七	Bìsùzēngqī	7th additional star
Black Tortoise of the North (北方玄武)	壁	Bì	Wall	壁	Bì	Wall	HD 223755		壁宿增八	Bìsùzēngbā	8th additional star
Black Tortoise of the North (北方玄武)	壁	Bì	Wall	壁	Bì	Wall	φ Peg		壁宿增九	Bìsùzēngjiǔ	9th additional star
Black Tortoise of the North (北方玄武)	壁	Bì	Wall	壁	Bì	Wall	86 Peg		壁宿增十	Bìsùzēngshí	10th additional star
Black Tortoise of the North (北方玄武)	壁	Bì	Wall	霹靂	Pīlì	Thunderbolt					
Black Tortoise of the North (北方玄武)	壁	Bì	Wall	霹靂	Pīlì	Thunderbolt	77 Peg		霹靂增五	Léidiànzēngwǔ	5th additional star
Black Tortoise of the North (北方玄武)	壁	Bì	Wall	霹靂	Pīlì	Thunderbolt	82 Peg		霹靂增六	Léidiànzēngliù	6th additional star
Black Tortoise of the North (北方玄武)	壁	Bì	Wall	霹靂	Pīlì	Thunderbolt	80 Peg		霹靂增七	Léidiànzēngqī	7th additional star

== See also ==
- Chinese astronomy
- Traditional Chinese star names
- Chinese constellations
