= List of stars in Pegasus =

This is the list of notable stars in the constellation Pegasus, sorted by decreasing brightness.

| Name | B | F | G. | Var | HD | HIP | RA | Dec | vis. mag. | abs. mag. | Dist. (ly) | Sp. class | Notes |
|---|---|---|---|---|---|---|---|---|---|---|---|---|---|
| ε Peg | ε | 8 | 11 | | 206778 | 107315 | 21^{h} 44^{m} 11.14^{s} | +09° 52′ 30.0″ | 2.38 | −4.19 | 672 | K2Ibvar | Enif, Enf, Enir, Al Anf, Fom, Fum al Faras, Os Pegasi |
| β Peg | β | 53 | | | 217906 | 113881 | 23^{h} 03^{m} 46.33^{s} | +28° 04′ 56.8″ | 2.44 | −1.49 | 199 | M2II-IIIvar | Scheat, Sheat, Seat Alpheras, Menkib |
| α Peg | α | 54 | | | 218045 | 113963 | 23^{h} 04^{m} 45.62^{s} | +15° 12′ 19.3″ | 2.49 | −0.67 | 140 | B9.5III | Markab, Marchab, Menkib al Faras, Matn al Faras |
| γ Peg | γ | 88 | | | 886 | 1067 | 00^{h} 13^{m} 14.15^{s} | +15° 11′ 01.0″ | 2.83 | −2.22 | 333 | B2IV | Algenib; β Cep variable |
| η Peg | η | 44 | | | 215182 | 112158 | 22^{h} 43^{m} 00.13^{s} | +30° 13′ 16.7″ | 2.93 | −1.16 | 215 | G2II-III.. | Matar, Sad al Matar |
| ζ Peg | ζ | 42 | | | 214923 | 112029 | 22^{h} 41^{m} 27.67^{s} | +10° 49′ 53.0″ | 3.41 | −0.62 | 208 | B8.5V | Homam, Homan, Humam, Al Hammam |
| μ Peg | μ | 48 | | | 216131 | 112748 | 22^{h} 50^{m} 00.10^{s} | +24° 36′ 06.1″ | 3.51 | 0.74 | 117 | M2III | Sadalbari, Sad al Bari, Sad al Nazi |
| θ Peg | θ | 26 | 25 | | 210418 | 109427 | 22^{h} 10^{m} 11.82^{s} | +06° 11′ 52.0″ | 3.52 | 1.16 | 97 | A2V | Baham, Biham, Sad al Baham |
| ι Peg | ι | 24 | | | 210027 | 109176 | 22^{h} 07^{m} 00.47^{s} | +25° 20′ 42.2″ | 3.77 | 3.42 | 38 | F5V | Jiu |
| λ Peg | λ | 47 | | | 215665 | 112440 | 22^{h} 46^{m} 31.84^{s} | +23° 33′ 56.4″ | 3.97 | −1.45 | 395 | G8II-III | Ligong |
| 1 Peg | (α) | 1 | | | 203504 | 105502 | 21^{h} 22^{m} 05.13^{s} | +19° 48′ 15.7″ | 4.08 | 0.71 | 154 | K1III | |
| κ Peg | κ | 10 | | | 206901 | 107354 | 21^{h} 44^{m} 38.70^{s} | +25° 38′ 42.0″ | 4.14 | 1.40 | 115 | F5IV | Jih |
| ξ Peg | ξ | 46 | | | 215648 | 112447 | 22^{h} 46^{m} 41.44^{s} | +12° 10′ 26.7″ | 4.20 | 3.15 | 53 | F7V | Tugongli |
| π Peg | π | 29 | | | 210459 | 109410 | 22^{h} 09^{m} 59.25^{s} | +33° 10′ 41.8″ | 4.28 | −0.16 | 252 | F5III | Neichu (for π² Peg), Woo |
| 9 Peg | (β) | 9 | | | 206859 | 107348 | 21^{h} 44^{m} 30.69^{s} | +17° 21′ 00.2″ | 4.34 | −2.87 | 901 | G5Ib | |
| υ Peg | υ | 68 | | | 220657 | 115623 | 23^{h} 25^{m} 22.66^{s} | +23° 24′ 14.4″ | 4.42 | 0.79 | 173 | F8IV | Alkarab |
| 2 Peg | | 2 | | | 204724 | 106140 | 21^{h} 29^{m} 56.88^{s} | +23° 38′ 19.8″ | 4.52 | −1.14 | 442 | M1III | |
| 55 Peg | | 55 | 42 | | 218329 | 114144 | 23^{h} 07^{m} 00.26^{s} | +09° 24′ 34.3″ | 4.54 | −0.43 | 322 | M2III | |
| 70 Peg | | 70 | | | 221115 | 115919 | 23^{h} 29^{m} 09.26^{s} | +12° 45′ 37.8″ | 4.54 | 0.86 | 178 | G8III | |
| τ Peg | τ | 62 | | | 220061 | 115250 | 23^{h} 20^{m} 38.22^{s} | +23° 44′ 25.3″ | 4.58 | 1.03 | 167 | A5V | Salm, Kerb, El Khereb, Markab; δ Sct variable |
| ψ Peg | ψ | 84 | | | 224427 | 118131 | 23^{h} 57^{m} 45.55^{s} | +25° 08′ 29.3″ | 4.63 | −0.98 | 432 | M3III | |
| 56 Peg | | 56 | | | 218356 | 114155 | 23^{h} 07^{m} 06.74^{s} | +25° 28′ 06.0″ | 4.76 | −1.32 | 537 | K0IIp | |
| 32 Peg | | 32 | | | 212097 | 110371 | 22^{h} 21^{m} 19.33^{s} | +28° 19′ 49.9″ | 4.78 | −1.57 | 607 | B9III | |
| 35 Peg | | 35 | 33 | | 212943 | 110882 | 22^{h} 27^{m} 51.48^{s} | +04° 41′ 47.1″ | 4.78 | 1.33 | 160 | K0III | |
| χ Peg | χ | 89 | | | 1013 | 1168 | 00^{h} 14^{m} 36.11^{s} | +20° 12′ 24.1″ | 4.79 | −0.21 | 326 | M2III | |
| ο Peg | ο | 43 | | | 214994 | 112051 | 22^{h} 41^{m} 45.41^{s} | +29° 18′ 27.7″ | 4.80 | −0.05 | 305 | A1IV | |
| 31 Peg | | 31 | | IN | 212076 | 110386 | 22^{h} 21^{m} 31.07^{s} | +12° 12′ 18.6″ | 4.82 | −2.55 | 970 | B2IV-V | IN Peg; Be star |
| ν Peg | ν | 22 | 20 | | 209747 | 109068 | 22^{h} 05^{m} 40.69^{s} | +05° 03′ 29.8″ | 4.86 | 0.32 | 263 | K4III | |
| ρ Peg | ρ | 50 | 40 | | 216735 | 113186 | 22^{h} 55^{m} 13.62^{s} | +08° 48′ 57.9″ | 4.91 | 0.22 | 282 | A1V | Leidian |
| 78 Peg | | 78 | | | 222842 | 117073 | 23^{h} 43^{m} 59.44^{s} | +29° 21′ 41.6″ | 4.93 | 0.65 | 234 | K0III | |
| 72 Peg | | 72 | | | 221673 | 116310 | 23^{h} 33^{m} 57.15^{s} | +31° 19′ 31.2″ | 4.97 | −1.16 | 548 | K4III | |
| 57 Peg | | 57 | 43 | GZ | 218634 | 114347 | 23^{h} 09^{m} 31.45^{s} | +08° 40′ 37.8″ | 5.05 | −1.79 | 762 | M4Sv | GZ Peg |
| φ Peg | φ | 81 | | | 223768 | 117718 | 23^{h} 52^{m} 29.29^{s} | +19° 07′ 13.3″ | 5.06 | −0.58 | 437 | M2III | |
| 14 Peg | | 14 | | | 207650 | 107763 | 21^{h} 49^{m} 50.68^{s} | +30° 10′ 27.4″ | 5.07 | 0.23 | 302 | A1Vs | |
| 16 Peg | | 16 | | OQ | 208057 | 108022 | 21^{h} 53^{m} 03.76^{s} | +25° 55′ 30.5″ | 5.09 | −0.89 | 512 | B3V | OQ Peg; Be star |
| 66 Peg | | 66 | | | 220363 | 115444 | 23^{h} 23^{m} 04.56^{s} | +12° 18′ 50.2″ | 5.09 | 0.06 | 330 | K3III | |
| 77 Peg | | 77 | 48 | | 222764 | 117020 | 23^{h} 43^{m} 22.36^{s} | +10° 19′ 53.4″ | 5.09 | −1.91 | 817 | M2III | |
| 59 Peg | | 59 | 45 | | 218918 | 114520 | 23^{h} 11^{m} 44.19^{s} | +08° 43′ 12.5″ | 5.15 | 0.70 | 253 | A5Vn | |
| σ Peg | σ | 49 | 39 | | 216385 | 112935 | 22^{h} 52^{m} 23.77^{s} | +09° 50′ 08.0″ | 5.16 | 3.02 | 88 | F7IV | |
| 12 Peg | | 12 | | | 207089 | 107472 | 21^{h} 46^{m} 04.36^{s} | +22° 56′ 56.0″ | 5.29 | −2.41 | 1128 | K0Ib | |
| 7 Peg | | 7 | 9 | | 206487 | 107151 | 21^{h} 42^{m} 15.44^{s} | +05° 40′ 48.5″ | 5.30 | −0.72 | 522 | M2III | |
| 82 Peg | | 82 | | HT | 223781 | 117730 | 23^{h} 52^{m} 37.12^{s} | +10° 56′ 50.4″ | 5.30 | 1.49 | 188 | A4Vn | HT Peg;δ Sct variable |
| 71 Peg | | 71 | | HW | 221615 | 116264 | 23^{h} 33^{m} 28.09^{s} | +22° 29′ 55.7″ | 5.33 | −0.90 | 575 | M5IIIa | HW Peg |
| 13 Peg | | 13 | 6 | V373 | 207652 | 107788 | 21^{h} 50^{m} 08.64^{s} | +17° 17′ 09.4″ | 5.34 | 2.72 | 109 | F2III-IV | V373 Peg |
| | | | | | 210889 | 109654 | 22^{h} 12^{m} 47.81^{s} | +34° 36′ 17.0″ | 5.34 | 0.87 | 256 | K2III | |
| 64 Peg | | 64 | | | 220222 | 115355 | 23^{h} 21^{m} 54.93^{s} | +31° 48′ 44.9″ | 5.35 | −1.69 | 834 | B6III | |
| 30 Peg | | 30 | 30 | | 211924 | 110298 | 22^{h} 20^{m} 27.56^{s} | +05° 47′ 22.2″ | 5.37 | −1.88 | 918 | B5IV | |
| 58 Peg | | 58 | 44 | | 218700 | 114389 | 23^{h} 10^{m} 01.47^{s} | +09° 49′ 19.6″ | 5.39 | −1.00 | 619 | B9III | |
| 51 Peg | | 51 | | | 217014 | 113357 | 22^{h} 57^{m} 27.85^{s} | +20° 46′ 07.3″ | 5.45 | 4.52 | 50 | G5V | Helvetios, has a planet b |
| 5 Peg | | 5 | | | 205852 | 106787 | 21^{h} 37^{m} 45.37^{s} | +19° 19′ 06.9″ | 5.46 | 0.49 | 321 | F1IV | |
| 75 Peg | | 75 | | KS | 222133 | 116611 | 23^{h} 37^{m} 56.77^{s} | +18° 24′ 02.2″ | 5.49 | 1.17 | 239 | A1Vn | KS Peg; β Lyr variable |
| 37 Peg | | 37 | 35 | | 213235 | 111062 | 22^{h} 29^{m} 57.95^{s} | +04° 25′ 55.4″ | 5.51 | 1.90 | 172 | F5IVs | |
| 15 Peg | | 15 | | | 207978 | 107975 | 21^{h} 52^{m} 29.96^{s} | +28° 47′ 37.3″ | 5.52 | 3.31 | 90 | F6IVwvar | |
| 17 Peg | | 17 | | | 208565 | 108339 | 21^{h} 56^{m} 56.39^{s} | +12° 04′ 35.5″ | 5.54 | −0.11 | 440 | A2Vnn | |
| 86 Peg | | 86 | | | 87 | 476 | 00^{h} 05^{m} 41.94^{s} | +13° 23′ 46.6″ | 5.55 | 0.26 | 373 | G5III | |
| 67 Peg | | 67 | | | 220599 | 115591 | 23^{h} 24^{m} 50.82^{s} | +32° 23′ 05.5″ | 5.56 | −0.40 | 506 | B9III | |
| 87 Peg | | 87 | | | 448 | 729 | 00^{h} 09^{m} 02.34^{s} | +18° 12′ 43.3″ | 5.57 | 0.81 | 292 | G9III | |
| 34 Vul | | (34) | | | 203344 | 105411 | 21^{h} 21^{m} 04.24^{s} | +23° 51′ 22.5″ | 5.58 | 0.91 | 280 | K1III | |
| π^{1} Peg | π^{1} | 27 | | | 210354 | 109352 | 22^{h} 09^{m} 13.68^{s} | +33° 10′ 21.0″ | 5.58 | 0.89 | 283 | G6III: | |
| 63 Peg | | 63 | | | 220088 | 115271 | 23^{h} 20^{m} 49.50^{s} | +30° 24′ 54.3″ | 5.58 | −0.05 | 435 | M0III | |
| 36 Peg | | 36 | 34 | | 213119 | 110986 | 22^{h} 29^{m} 07.95^{s} | +09° 07′ 44.7″ | 5.60 | −0.65 | 579 | K5III | |
| 20 Peg | | 20 | | | 209166 | 108693 | 22^{h} 01^{m} 05.32^{s} | +13° 07′ 11.9″ | 5.61 | 1.39 | 228 | F4III | |
| 11 Peg | | 11 | 12 | | 207203 | 107575 | 21^{h} 47^{m} 13.96^{s} | +02° 41′ 10.1″ | 5.63 | −0.15 | 467 | A1V | 27 Aquarii |
| 73 Peg | | 73 | | | 221758 | 116355 | 23^{h} 34^{m} 38.21^{s} | +33° 29′ 50.2″ | 5.63 | 0.77 | 305 | K0III: | |
| 38 Peg | | 38 | | | 213323 | 111068 | 22^{h} 30^{m} 01.79^{s} | +32° 34′ 21.6″ | 5.64 | 0.16 | 407 | B9.5V | |
| 19 Peg | | 19 | 18 | | 209167 | 108699 | 22^{h} 01^{m} 09.24^{s} | +08° 15′ 25.8″ | 5.65 | −0.71 | 609 | K5III | |
| 4 Peg | | 4 | 7 | | 205924 | 106856 | 21^{h} 38^{m} 31.87^{s} | +05° 46′ 18.0″ | 5.66 | 2.02 | 174 | A9IV-Vn | |
| | | | | | 218792 | 114449 | 23^{h} 10^{m} 42.62^{s} | +17° 35′ 40.0″ | 5.68 | −0.27 | 505 | K4III | |
| | | | | | 208108 | 108060 | 21^{h} 53^{m} 37.37^{s} | +19° 40′ 06.2″ | 5.69 | 1.45 | 230 | A0Vs | |
| 23 Peg | | 23 | | | 209833 | 109056 | 22^{h} 05^{m} 34.65^{s} | +28° 57′ 50.4″ | 5.69 | 0.84 | 304 | B9Vn | |
| | | | | | 214850 | 111974 | 22^{h} 40^{m} 52.52^{s} | +14° 32′ 55.9″ | 5.72 | 3.14 | 107 | G3V+... | |
| | | | | | 210074 | 109209 | 22^{h} 07^{m} 28.52^{s} | +19° 28′ 31.6″ | 5.74 | 1.81 | 199 | F2V: | |
| | | | | | 209761 | 109023 | 22^{h} 05^{m} 11.32^{s} | +26° 40′ 25.0″ | 5.75 | 0.32 | 397 | K2III | |
| 34 Peg | | 34 | 32 | | 212754 | 110785 | 22^{h} 26^{m} 37.22^{s} | +04° 23′ 37.1″ | 5.76 | 2.78 | 129 | F7V | |
| 52 Peg | | 52 | | | 217232 | 113503 | 22^{h} 59^{m} 11.80^{s} | +11° 43′ 44.2″ | 5.76 | 1.20 | 266 | A7V | |
| NZ Peg | | | | NZ | 206043 | 106897 | 21^{h} 39^{m} 01.11^{s} | +20° 15′ 55.6″ | 5.77 | 2.81 | 127 | F2V | γ Dor variable |
| 80 Peg | | 80 | 51 | HH | 223637 | 117628 | 23^{h} 51^{m} 21.25^{s} | +09° 18′ 48.6″ | 5.77 | −1.20 | 807 | M3III | HH Peg |
| | | | | | 207840 | 107887 | 21^{h} 51^{m} 34.24^{s} | +19° 49′ 35.9″ | 5.78 | −0.49 | 584 | B8III | |
| | | | | | 210502 | 109471 | 22^{h} 10^{m} 37.46^{s} | +11° 37′ 28.8″ | 5.78 | −0.63 | 625 | M1III | |
| 25 Peg | | 25 | | | 210129 | 109240 | 22^{h} 07^{m} 50.33^{s} | +21° 42′ 11.1″ | 5.79 | −0.86 | 698 | B7Vn | |
| | | | | | 213179 | 110992 | 22^{h} 29^{m} 10.21^{s} | +26° 45′ 47.6″ | 5.79 | −1.85 | 1098 | K2II | |
| 85 Peg | | 85 | | | 224930 | 171 | 00^{h} 02^{m} 09.65^{s} | +27° 05′ 04.2″ | 5.80 | 5.33 | 40 | G3V | |
| 21 Peg | | 21 | | | 209459 | 108875 | 22^{h} 03^{m} 19.02^{s} | +11° 23′ 11.6″ | 5.83 | −0.27 | 541 | B9.5V | |
| NV Peg | | | | NV | 204585 | 106062 | 21^{h} 28^{m} 59.76^{s} | +22° 10′ 45.9″ | 5.84 | −0.49 | 603 | M4III | |
| 40 Peg | | 40 | | | 214567 | 111810 | 22^{h} 38^{m} 52.62^{s} | +19° 31′ 21.0″ | 5.84 | 0.50 | 381 | G8II | |
| | | | | | 219139 | 114641 | 23^{h} 13^{m} 26.51^{s} | +11° 03′ 54.1″ | 5.85 | 0.79 | 335 | G5III: | |
| IM Peg | | | | IM | 216489 | 112997 | 22^{h} 53^{m} 02.28^{s} | +16° 50′ 28.5″ | 5.86 | 0.93 | 316 | K1III SB | RS CVn variable |
| | | | | | 211006 | 109730 | 22^{h} 13^{m} 38.65^{s} | +28° 36′ 28.9″ | 5.87 | 1.45 | 249 | K2III | |
| | | | | | 214995 | 112067 | 22^{h} 41^{m} 57.40^{s} | +14° 30′ 59.2″ | 5.92 | 1.36 | 267 | K0III: | |
| HD 210702 | | | | | 210702 | 109577 | 22^{h} 11^{m} 51.33^{s} | +16° 02′ 26.1″ | 5.93 | 2.19 | 182 | K1III | has a planet (b) |
| 79 Peg | | 79 | | | 223461 | 117500 | 23^{h} 49^{m} 39.35^{s} | +28° 50′ 32.4″ | 5.95 | 1.39 | 267 | A2m | |
| HN Peg | | | | HN | 206860 | 107350 | 21^{h} 44^{m} 31.19^{s} | +14° 46′ 20.0″ | 5.96 | 4.64 | 60 | G0V | BY Draconis variable |
| | | | | | 210762 | 109602 | 22^{h} 12^{m} 08.09^{s} | +24° 57′ 02.3″ | 5.97 | −3.88 | 3047 | K0 | |
| HR 8799 | | | | V342 | 218396 | 114189 | 23^{h} 07^{m} 28.65^{s} | +21° 08′ 03.7″ | 5.97 | 2.96 | 130 | A5V | V342 Peg; has four planets (b, c, d & e) |
| 69 Peg | | 69 | | HV | 220933 | 115806 | 23^{h} 27^{m} 40.37^{s} | +25° 10′ 02.5″ | 5.99 | 0.73 | 367 | A0MNp... | HV Peg; α² CVn variable |
| 47 G. Peg | | | 47 | | 222377 | 116768 | 23^{h} 39^{m} 54.99^{s} | +09° 40′ 38.4″ | 5.99 | 2.16 | 190 | A2m | |
| 18 Peg | | 18 | 17 | | 209008 | 108612 | 22^{h} 00^{m} 07.92^{s} | +06° 43′ 02.8″ | 6.00 | −1.58 | 1069 | B3III | |
| | | | | | 212988 | 110873 | 22^{h} 27^{m} 46.22^{s} | +31° 50′ 23.9″ | 6.00 | −1.29 | 937 | K2 | |
| | | | | | 206540 | 107173 | 21^{h} 42^{m} 32.95^{s} | +10° 49′ 27.6″ | 6.06 | −0.59 | 697 | B5IV | |
| IK Peg | | | | IK | 204188 | 105860 | 21^{h} 26^{m} 26.61^{s} | +19° 22′ 32.2″ | 6.08 | 2.76 | 150 | A8m | |
| | | | | | 210210 | 109276 | 22^{h} 08^{m} 17.26^{s} | +25° 32′ 37.0″ | 6.08 | 1.40 | 281 | F1IV | |
| | | | | | 204862 | 106243 | 21^{h} 31^{m} 09.62^{s} | +12° 08′ 15.0″ | 6.10 | 0.57 | 417 | B9.5V | |
| | | | | | 221662 | 116307 | 23^{h} 33^{m} 55.50^{s} | +20° 50′ 27.5″ | 6.10 | −1.42 | 1042 | M3III | |
| | | | | | 214200 | 111567 | 22^{h} 36^{m} 07.90^{s} | +35° 34′ 39.5″ | 6.11 | 0.57 | 417 | K0 | |
| V343 Peg | | | | V343 | 218395 | 114187 | 23^{h} 07^{m} 27.74^{s} | +32° 49′ 31.3″ | 6.13 | 0.24 | 491 | A3 | |
| 23 Psc | | (23) | | | 223755 | 117710 | 23^{h} 52^{m} 23.42^{s} | +21° 40′ 16.0″ | 6.13 | 0.01 | 547 | M2III | |
| 13 G. Peg | | | 13 | | 208110 | 108090 | 21^{h} 53^{m} 57.72^{s} | +06° 51′ 53.2″ | 6.14 | 0.63 | 413 | G0IIIs | |
| | | | | | 218235 | 114081 | 23^{h} 06^{m} 18.00^{s} | +18° 31′ 03.4″ | 6.16 | 2.98 | 141 | F6Vs | |
| | | | | | 206027 | 106872 | 21^{h} 38^{m} 45.16^{s} | +25° 29′ 55.7″ | 6.18 | 0.65 | 416 | G9III | |
| V372 Peg | | | | V372 | 207223 | 107558 | 21^{h} 47^{m} 04.70^{s} | +17° 11′ 38.7″ | 6.18 | 2.67 | 164 | F3V | |
| | | | | | 210460 | 109439 | 22^{h} 10^{m} 18.96^{s} | +19° 36′ 59.6″ | 6.18 | 2.46 | 181 | G0V | |
| 31 G. Peg | | | 31 | | 211976 | 110341 | 22^{h} 20^{m} 55.77^{s} | +08° 11′ 12.1″ | 6.18 | 3.67 | 104 | F6V | |
| | | | | | 224303 | 118048 | 23^{h} 56^{m} 41.52^{s} | +22° 38′ 53.2″ | 6.18 | −0.15 | 603 | M2III | |
| 3 Peg | | 3 | 6 | | 205811 | 106783 | 21^{h} 37^{m} 43.61^{s} | +06° 37′ 06.2″ | 6.19 | 1.71 | 257 | A2V | |
| 60 Peg | | 60 | | | 218935 | 114526 | 23^{h} 11^{m} 49.31^{s} | +26° 50′ 51.3″ | 6.19 | 1.84 | 242 | G8III-IV | |
| 33 Peg | | 33 | | | 212395 | 110548 | 22^{h} 23^{m} 39.36^{s} | +20° 50′ 53.8″ | 6.20 | 3.55 | 111 | F7V | |
| 29 G. Peg | | | 29 | | 211287 | 109939 | 22^{h} 15^{m} 59.81^{s} | +08° 32′ 58.6″ | 6.21 | 0.79 | 395 | A1Vn | |
| | | | | | 205541 | 106605 | 21^{h} 35^{m} 27.03^{s} | +24° 27′ 07.9″ | 6.22 | −0.41 | 689 | A4V | |
| | | | | | 417 | 716 | 00^{h} 08^{m} 52.07^{s} | +25° 27′ 46.3″ | 6.24 | 0.69 | 419 | K0III | |
| | | | | | 225276 | 399 | 00^{h} 04^{m} 55.93^{s} | +26° 38′ 55.7″ | 6.25 | −0.11 | 610 | K4IIIb | |
| | | | | | 1048 | 1193 | 00^{h} 14^{m} 55.87^{s} | +22° 17′ 03.3″ | 6.25 | 1.06 | 355 | A1p | |
| | | | | | 205539 | 106595 | 21^{h} 35^{m} 19.02^{s} | +28° 11′ 51.7″ | 6.25 | 1.97 | 235 | F0IV | |
| | | | | | 212670 | 110696 | 22^{h} 25^{m} 40.68^{s} | +18° 26′ 39.3″ | 6.26 | 0.05 | 568 | K0 | |
| 74 Peg | | 74 | | | 222098 | 116592 | 23^{h} 37^{m} 39.66^{s} | +16° 49′ 31.8″ | 6.26 | 1.02 | 363 | A1V | |
| | | | | | 202128 | 104771 | 21^{h} 13^{m} 28.77^{s} | +15° 58′ 56.8″ | 6.27 | 1.51 | 292 | A7Vn | |
| | | | | | 207563 | 107734 | 21^{h} 49^{m} 26.87^{s} | +20° 27′ 44.8″ | 6.27 | −2.49 | 1842 | B2V | |
| HO Peg | | | | HO | 207932 | 107956 | 21^{h} 52^{m} 18.17^{s} | +21° 16′ 23.2″ | 6.27 | −1.69 | 1273 | M8III | |
| 45 Peg | | 45 | | | 215510 | 112358 | 22^{h} 45^{m} 28.19^{s} | +19° 21′ 59.1″ | 6.27 | 1.11 | 351 | G6III: | |
| | | | | | 207134 | 107502 | 21^{h} 46^{m} 23.84^{s} | +25° 33′ 48.1″ | 6.28 | 0.98 | 374 | K3III: | |
| 65 Peg | | 65 | | | 220318 | 115407 | 23^{h} 22^{m} 40.50^{s} | +20° 49′ 43.5″ | 6.28 | 0.41 | 487 | B9.5V | |
| | | | | | 210594 | 109493 | 22^{h} 10^{m} 51.70^{s} | +30° 33′ 11.0″ | 6.30 | 0.76 | 418 | A8IV | |
| | | | | | 214298 | 111649 | 22^{h} 37^{m} 04.86^{s} | +12° 34′ 36.8″ | 6.30 | −0.74 | 836 | K5 | |
| 76 Peg | | 76 | | | 222683 | 116972 | 23^{h} 42^{m} 43.81^{s} | +16° 20′ 08.5″ | 6.30 | 0.82 | 406 | K0 | |
| OY Peg | | | | OY | 210090 | 109212 | 22^{h} 07^{m} 29.95^{s} | +18° 00′ 02.8″ | 6.31 | −1.00 | 945 | M1 | |
| | | | | | 219927 | 115148 | 23^{h} 19^{m} 27.40^{s} | +34° 47′ 35.5″ | 6.32 | −0.33 | 697 | B8III | |
| GX Peg | | | | GX | 213534 | 111191 | 22^{h} 31^{m} 34.37^{s} | +29° 32′ 34.2″ | 6.33 | 0.85 | 408 | A5m | δ Sct variable |
| 41 Peg | | 41 | | | 214698 | 111884 | 22^{h} 39^{m} 47.01^{s} | +19° 40′ 52.1″ | 6.33 | −0.12 | 635 | A2V | |
| | | | | | 219110 | 114607 | 23^{h} 13^{m} 04.01^{s} | +29° 26′ 29.8″ | 6.34 | 0.78 | 422 | G8III | |
| | | | | | 213644 | 111296 | 22^{h} 32^{m} 46.90^{s} | +15° 51′ 47.6″ | 6.35 | −0.30 | 698 | K0 | |
| | | | | | 208202 | 108119 | 21^{h} 54^{m} 17.44^{s} | +19° 43′ 05.3″ | 6.36 | 1.12 | 364 | K0III+... | |
| | | | | | 209288 | 108766 | 22^{h} 02^{m} 01.37^{s} | +10° 58′ 25.7″ | 6.36 | −1.71 | 1342 | B5IIIn | |
| | | | | | 209693 | 108969 | 22^{h} 04^{m} 34.51^{s} | +32° 56′ 30.3″ | 6.36 | −0.99 | 962 | G5Ia | |
| | | | | | 210461 | 109445 | 22^{h} 10^{m} 22.02^{s} | +14° 37′ 47.7″ | 6.36 | 0.79 | 424 | K0III | |
| | | | | | 214979 | 112032 | 22^{h} 41^{m} 31.28^{s} | +30° 57′ 57.1″ | 6.36 | −0.67 | 832 | K5 | |
| | | | | | 219310 | 114742 | 23^{h} 14^{m} 36.42^{s} | +24° 06′ 10.4″ | 6.36 | 0.41 | 504 | K2III | |
| | | | | | 215549 | 112368 | 22^{h} 45^{m} 34.64^{s} | +30° 26′ 36.3″ | 6.37 | 2.59 | 186 | K1III-IV | |
| | | | | | 209709 | 109009 | 22^{h} 05^{m} 03.47^{s} | +14° 48′ 57.4″ | 6.38 | 0.41 | 509 | M2.5III: | |
| | | | | | 211432 | 109977 | 22^{h} 16^{m} 29.66^{s} | +27° 48′ 14.5″ | 6.38 | 0.94 | 399 | G9III | |
| | | | | | 220288 | 115389 | 23^{h} 22^{m} 28.58^{s} | +25° 55′ 06.6″ | 6.38 | −1.22 | 1079 | K3III | |
| 2 G. Peg | (ι) | | 2 | | 204445 | 106021 | 21^{h} 28^{m} 24.83^{s} | +08° 11′ 44.6″ | 6.39 | −0.83 | 906 | M1 | |
| HD 208527 | | | | | 208527 | 108296 | 21^{h} 56^{m} 23.98^{s} | +21° 14′ 23.4″ | 6.39 | −1.34 | 1148 | M1III | |
| HR Peg | | | | HR | 216672 | 113131 | 22^{h} 54^{m} 35.62^{s} | +16° 56′ 30.7″ | 6.39 | −0.97 | 967 | S5,1 | |
| 3 G. Peg | | | 3 | | 204603 | 106103 | 21^{h} 29^{m} 34.49^{s} | +06° 34′ 53.0″ | 6.41 | −0.60 | 823 | K0 | |
| | | | | | 219291 | 114725 | 23^{h} 14^{m} 21.72^{s} | +29° 46′ 18.7″ | 6.41 | 1.15 | 368 | F6IVw | |
| V354 Peg | | | | V354 | 221394 | 116119 | 23^{h} 31^{m} 43.05^{s} | +28° 24′ 12.7″ | 6.41 | 0.57 | 481 | A1p Sr(CrEu) | α² CVn variable |
| | | | | | 221493 | 116187 | 23^{h} 32^{m} 29.03^{s} | +23° 50′ 37.2″ | 6.41 | −0.23 | 694 | K5 | |
| | | | | | 204560 | 106064 | 21^{h} 28^{m} 59.92^{s} | +17° 54′ 21.3″ | 6.42 | 0.31 | 544 | K5 | |
| | | | | | 214203 | 111601 | 22^{h} 36^{m} 36.34^{s} | +11° 41′ 47.8″ | 6.42 | 1.11 | 376 | A1III | |
| | | | | | 224758 | 34 | 00^{h} 00^{m} 23.87^{s} | +26° 55′ 05.7″ | 6.43 | 1.95 | 256 | F7.5IV-V | |
| | | | | | 205011 | 106306 | 21^{h} 31^{m} 50.15^{s} | +23° 50′ 42.6″ | 6.43 | 0.43 | 517 | G8Ib | |
| | | | | | 206793 | 107297 | 21^{h} 43^{m} 58.12^{s} | +22° 48′ 55.4″ | 6.43 | 0.16 | 585 | K2 | |
| 39 Peg | | 39 | | V643 | 213617 | 111278 | 22^{h} 32^{m} 35.38^{s} | +20° 13′ 47.8″ | 6.43 | 2.81 | 172 | F1V | V643 Pegasi; γ Dor variable |
| 41 G. Peg | | | 41 | | 217166 | 113445 | 22^{h} 58^{m} 34.85^{s} | +09° 21′ 26.0″ | 6.43 | 3.98 | 101 | G2V+... | |
| | | | | | 218101 | 113994 | 23^{h} 05^{m} 06.40^{s} | +16° 33′ 48.1″ | 6.43 | 3.40 | 132 | G8IV | |
| | | | | | 218261 | 114096 | 23^{h} 06^{m} 31.71^{s} | +19° 54′ 39.0″ | 6.44 | 4.18 | 92 | F7V | |
| | | | | | 221905 | 116465 | 23^{h} 35^{m} 55.94^{s} | +24° 33′ 39.6″ | 6.44 | −1.49 | 1254 | M1III | |
| | | | | | 205420 | 106527 | 21^{h} 34^{m} 33.97^{s} | +22° 45′ 16.7″ | 6.45 | 2.25 | 226 | F7V | |
| 28 Peg | | 28 | | | 210516 | 109458 | 22^{h} 10^{m} 30.18^{s} | +20° 58′ 40.8″ | 6.45 | −0.09 | 663 | A3III | |
| | | | | | 221113 | 115915 | 23^{h} 29^{m} 05.70^{s} | +23° 02′ 53.8″ | 6.45 | 0.44 | 520 | G9III | |
| V363 Peg | | | | V363 | 224186 | 117986 | 23^{h} 55^{m} 54.63^{s} | +15° 13′ 49.1″ | 6.45 | −0.35 | 746 | M3 | |
| | | | | | 209149 | 108632 | 22^{h} 00^{m} 26.71^{s} | +33° 00′ 20.8″ | 6.46 | 2.35 | 217 | F5III | |
| PT Peg | | | | PT | 212047 | 110346 | 22^{h} 21^{m} 00.05^{s} | +26° 56′ 06.6″ | 6.46 | −0.47 | 793 | M4III | |
| | | | | | 225292 | 410 | 00^{h} 05^{m} 01.13^{s} | +27° 40′ 29.3″ | 6.47 | 0.88 | 427 | G8II | |
| | | | | | 434 | 728 | 00^{h} 09^{m} 00.16^{s} | +28° 14′ 51.2″ | 6.47 | 1.16 | 377 | A4Vm | |
| | | | | | 205422 | 106550 | 21^{h} 34^{m} 45.89^{s} | +18° 19′ 44.0″ | 6.47 | −0.30 | 736 | K2 | |
| 10 G. Peg | | | 10 | | 206689 | 107271 | 21^{h} 43^{m} 39.79^{s} | +07° 31′ 43.7″ | 6.47 | 0.89 | 426 | K0 | |
| | | | | | 219196 | 114686 | 23^{h} 13^{m} 59.34^{s} | +19° 38′ 02.1″ | 6.47 | −0.47 | 795 | K2 | |
| | | | | | 213025 | 110907 | 22^{h} 28^{m} 11.15^{s} | +27° 01′ 08.0″ | 6.48 | 0.63 | 482 | G8III | |
| | | | | | 205603 | 106643 | 21^{h} 36^{m} 05.09^{s} | +15° 04′ 56.0″ | 6.50 | 0.82 | 447 | G8II | |
| HD 208897 | | | | | 208897 | 108513 | 21^{h} 58^{m} 59.64^{s} | +19° 01′ 13.4″ | 6.50 | 2.48 | 208 | K0 | has a planet (b) |
| | | | | | 210890 | 109691 | 22^{h} 13^{m} 10.01^{s} | +18° 16′ 47.6″ | 6.50 | −0.31 | 751 | K2 | |
| | | | | | 211076 | 109788 | 22^{h} 14^{m} 18.45^{s} | +17° 11′ 22.4″ | 6.50 | 1.07 | 398 | K4III | |
| 61 Peg | | 61 | | | 219477 | 114844 | 23^{h} 15^{m} 46.28^{s} | +28° 14′ 52.5″ | 6.51 | −0.83 | 956 | G5III | |
| MT Peg | | | | | 217813 | 113829 | 23^{h} 03^{m} 04.98^{s} | +20° 55′ 06.9″ | 6.62 | 4.65 | 79 | G1V | BY Dra variable |
| HD 220773 | | | | | 220773 | 115697 | 23^{h} 26^{m} 27.0^{s} | +08° 38′ 38″ | 7.09 | | 160 | F9 | has a planet (b) |
| HD 204378 | (κ) | | | | 204378 | 105995 | 21^{h} 28^{m} 02.63^{s} | +03° 10′ 49.5″ | 7.54 | | 780 | F5 | |
| V376 Peg | | | | V376 | 209458 | 108859 | 22^{h} 03^{m} 10.77^{s} | +18° 53′ 03.6″ | 7.65 | 4.28 | 154 | F8-G0V | has the transiting planet HD 209458 b (Osiris) |
| HD 219828 | | | | | 219828 | 115100 | 23^{h} 18^{m} 46.73^{s} | +18° 38′ 44.6″ | 8.02 | 3.47 | 264 | G0IV | has two planets (b & c) |
| HD 214823 | | | | | 214823 | 111928 | 22^{h} 40^{m} 19.9^{s} | +31° 47′ 15″ | 8.08 | | | G0V | has a planet (b) |
| HD 220197 | | | | | 220197 | 115359 | 23^{h} 21^{m} 58.0^{s} | +16° 37′ 57″ | 9.00 | | 210 | F8V | has a planet (b) |
| HIP 109600 | | | | | | 109600 | 22^{h} 12^{m} 06.0^{s} | +29° 03′ 57″ | 9.16 | | 191 | G5 | has a planet (b) |
| BD+14°4559 | | | | | | 104780 | 21^{h} 13^{m} 35.99^{s} | +14° 41′ 21.8″ | 9.66 | 6.17 | 163 | K2V | Solaris, has a planet (b) |
| HAT-P-8 | | | | | | | 22^{h} 52^{m} 09.86^{s} | +35° 26′ 49.6″ | 10.17 | 3.36 | 750 | | has a transiting planet (b) |
| WASP-134 | | | | | | | 21^{h} 50^{m} 17.0^{s} | +04° 11′ 40″ | 11.3 | | 636 | G4 | has two transiting planets (b and c) |
| WASP-21 | | | | | | | 23^{h} 09^{m} 58.25^{s} | +18° 23′ 45.9″ | 11.55 | 4.75 | 750 | G3V | Tangra, has a transiting planet (b) |
| WASP-52 | | | | | | | 23^{h} 13^{m} 59.0^{s} | +08° 45′ 41″ | 12 | | 457 | K2V | Anadolu, has a transiting planet (b) |
| WASP-60 | | | | | | | 23^{h} 15^{m} 58^{s} | +31° 27′ 46″ | 12.18 | | 1305 | G1V | Morava, has a transiting planet (b) |
| WASP-10 | | | | | | | 23^{h} 15^{m} 58^{s} | +31° 27′ 46″ | 12.7 | 7.9 | 290 | K0V | has a transiting planet (b) |
| WASP-102 | | | | | | | 22^{h} 25^{m} 51.4^{s} | +15° 51′ 24″ | 12.73 | | | G0 | has a transiting planet (b) |
| WASP-114 | | | | | | | 21^{h} 50^{m} 40.0^{s} | +10° 27′ 47″ | 12.74 | | 1500 | G0 | has a transiting planet (b) |
| WASP-59 | | | | | | | 23^{h} 18^{m} 30.0^{s} | +24° 53′ 21″ | 13 | | 408 | K5V | has a transiting planet (b) |
| V391 Pegasi | | | | V391 | | | 22^{h} 04^{m} 12.2^{s} | +26° 25′ 08″ | 14.57 | 3.84 | 4561 | sdB | has a planet (b) |
Table legend: • Name = Proper name • B = Bayer designation • F or/and G. = Flamsteed designation or Gould designation • Var = Variable-star designation • HD = Henry Draper Catalogue designation number • HIP = Hipparcos Catalogue designation number • RA = Right ascension for the Epoch/Equinox J2000.0 • Dec = Declination for the Epoch/Equinox J2000.0 • vis. mag. = visual magnitude (m or m_{v}), also known as apparent magnitude • abs. mag. = absolute magnitude (M_{v}) • Dist. (ly) = Distance in light-years from Earth • Sp. class = Spectral class of the star in the stellar classification system • Notes = Common name(s) or alternate name(s); comments; notable properties [for example: multiple star status, range of variability if it is a variable star, exoplanets, etc.]

== See also ==
- List of stars by constellation
