= Zeta Pegasi =

Star in the constellation Pegasus

- Location of ζ Pegasi (circled)

Observation data Epoch J2000.0 Equinox ICRS
- Constellation: Pegasus
- Right ascension: 22^{h} 41^{m} 27.72072^{s}
- Declination: +10° 49′ 52.9079″
- Apparent magnitude (V): +3.414

Characteristics
- Spectral type: B8 V
- U−B color index: −0.181
- B−V color index: −0.088
- Variable type: SPB

Astrometry
Radial velocity (R_{v})	+7.0 km/s
Proper motion (μ)	RA: +77.22 mas/yr Dec.: −11.38 mas/yr
Parallax (π)	15.96±0.19 mas
Distance	204 ± 2 ly (62.7 ± 0.7 pc)

Details
Mass	3.22 M_{☉}
Radius	4.23±0.25 R_{☉}
Luminosity	224 L_{☉}
Surface gravity (log g)	3.67±0.05 cgs
Temperature	12,300±1,000 K
Metallicity [Fe/H]	+0.06 dex
Rotational velocity (v sin i)	140 – 210 km/s
Age	120 Myr

Other designations
- Homam, Zeta Peg, ζ Peg, 42 Peg, BD+10°4797, FK5 855, HD 214923, HIP 112029, HR 8634, SAO 108103

Database references
SIMBAD	data

Zeta Pegasi or ζ Pegasi, formally named Homam (/ˈhoʊmæm/), is a single star in the northern constellation of Pegasus. With an apparent visual magnitude of +3.4, this star is bright enough to be seen with the naked eye and is one of the brighter members of Pegasus. Parallax measurements place it at a distance of around 204 light-years (62.7 parsecs) from the Sun.

== Nomenclature ==
ζ Pegasi (Latinised to Zeta Pegasi) is the star's Bayer designation.

It bore the traditional name Homam, meaning "Man of High Spirit" or "Lucky Star of High Minded". In 2016, the International Astronomical Union organized a Working Group on Star Names (WGSN) to catalogue and standardize proper names for stars. The WGSN approved the name Homam for this star on 21 August 2016 and it is now so entered in the IAU Catalog of Star Names.

In Chinese, 雷電 (Léi Diàn), meaning Thunder and Lightning, refers to an asterism consisting ζ Pegasi, ξ Pegasi, σ Pegasi, 55 Pegasi, 66 Pegasi and 70 Pegasi. Consequently, the Chinese name for ζ Pegasi itself is 雷電一 (Léi Diàn yī), "the First Star of Thunder and Lightning".

== Properties ==
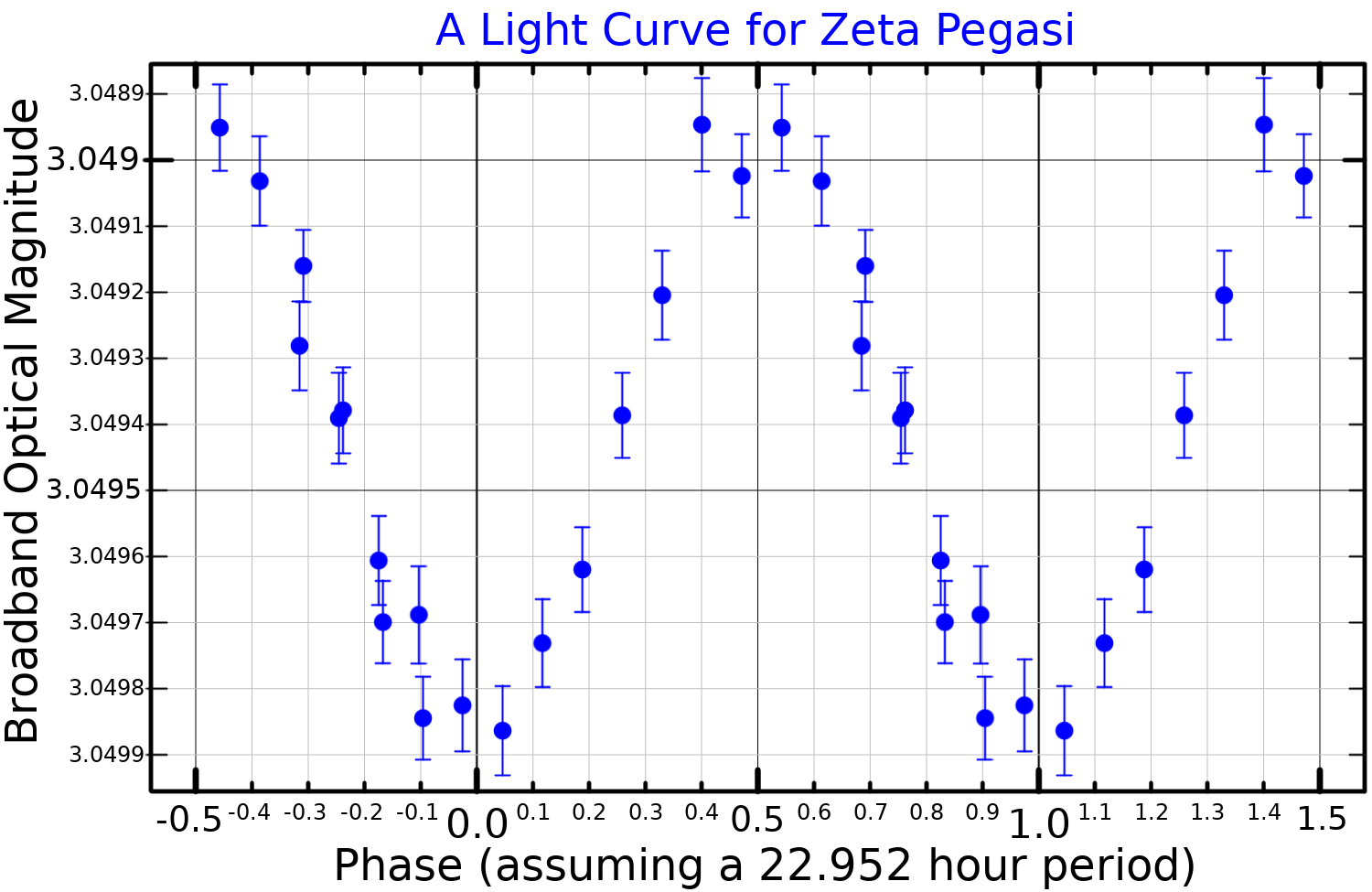
A light curve for Zeta Pegasi, adapted from Goebel (2007)

This star has a stellar classification of B8 V, which identifies it as a large B-type main sequence star that is generating energy through the nuclear fusion of hydrogen at its core. The radius of this star is about four times that of the Sun. In 2007, John H. Goebel showed that Zeta Pegasi is a variable star, using data obtained from Gravity Probe B. It is a slowly pulsating B star that varies slightly in luminosity with a period of 22.952±0.804 hours, completing 1.04566 cycles per day. Zeta Pegasi is about 120 million years old and is rotating rapidly with a projected rotational velocity in the range of 140 to 210 km/s. The effective temperature of its outer envelope is around 12,300 K, giving it the characteristic blue-white glow of a B-type star.

Zeta Pegasi has been examined for infrared excess that may indicate the presence of circumstellar matter, but none was found. This star does have two optical companions. The first is a magnitude 11.6 star at an angular separation of 68 arcseconds along a position angle of 139°, as of 1997. The second is an 11th magnitude star at a separation of 177 arcseconds with a position angle of 5°. Zeta Pegasi is not known to be a member of a stellar association.
