= Pi Pegasi =

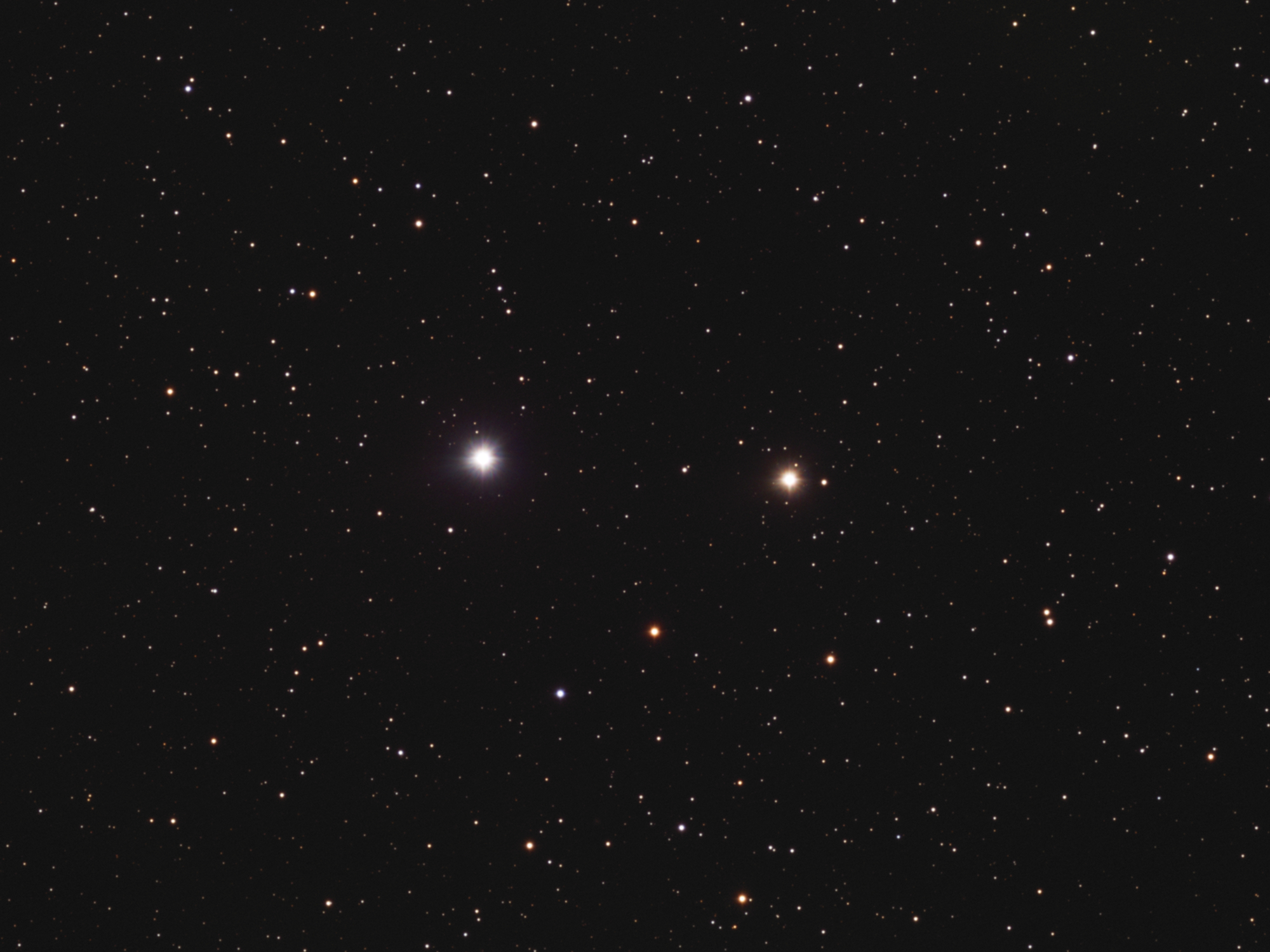
π^{1} Pegasi (right) and π^{2} Pegasi (left) in optical light

The Bayer designation Pi Pegasi (π Peg / π Pegasi) is shared by two stars, in the constellation Pegasus:

- π^{1} Pegasi
- π^{2} Pegasi

They are separated on the sky by 10′, or one-sixth of a degree.
