= HD 220773 =

Star in the constellation Pegasus

Observation data Epoch J2000 Equinox J2000
- Constellation: Pegasus
- Right ascension: 23^{h} 26^{m} 27.445^{s}
- Declination: +08° 38′ 37.84″
- Apparent magnitude (V): 7.10

Characteristics
- Evolutionary stage: subgiant
- Spectral type: G0 V or F9 V
- B−V color index: 0.602±0.005

Astrometry
| Radial velocity (R_{v}) | −37.735±0.0009 km/s |
| Proper motion (μ) | RA: 27.096 mas/yr Dec.: −222.458 mas/yr |
| Parallax (π) | 19.7694±0.0669 mas |
| Distance | 165.0 ± 0.6 ly (50.6 ± 0.2 pc) |
| Absolute magnitude (M_{V}) | 3.57 |

Details
| Mass | 1.154±0.003 M_{☉} |
| Radius | 1.73±0.02 R_{☉} |
| Luminosity | 3.16±0.01 L_{☉} |
| Surface gravity (log g) | 4.02±0.01 cgs |
| Temperature | 5,852±26 K |
| Metallicity [Fe/H] | 0.09±0.06 dex |
| Rotational velocity (v sin i) | 3.82±1.00 km/s |
| Age | 6.3±0.1 Gyr |

Other designations
- BD+07 5030, HD 220773, HIP 115697, SAO 128181, 2MASS J23262744+0838376, Gaia DR2 2761142326076104192

Database references
| SIMBAD | data |

HD 220773 is a star in the northern constellation of Pegasus. It has an apparent visual magnitude of 7.10, which is too faint to be visible with the naked eye. The distance to this system, as determined by parallax measurements, is 165 light years, but it is drifting closer with a radial velocity of −37.7 km/s. The star shows a high proper motion, traversing the celestial sphere at an angular rate of 0.187 arcsec yr^{−1}.

The spectrum of HD 220773 presents as a late type star F-type or early G-type main-sequence star with a stellar classification of F9 V or G0 V, respectively. It is older than the Sun, with an estimated age of 6.3 billion years, and the magnetic activity in the chromosphere is at a low level. The star has 15% greater mass than the Sun but the radius is 73% larger. The abundance of iron, a measure of the star's metallicity, is slightly higher than solar. It is radiating over three times the luminosity of the Sun from its photosphere at an effective temperature of 5,852 K.

A survey in 2015 ruled out the existence of any additional stellar companions at projected distances from 31 to 337 astronomical units.

== Search for planets ==
The detection of an exoplanet, HD 220773 b, by the radial velocity method was claimed in 2012 based on observations at the McDonald Observatory. As the inclination of the orbital plane is unknown, only a lower bound on the mass can be determined. This object has at least 1.45 times the mass of Jupiter. It has a very eccentric orbit with a semimajor axis of around 5 AU, taking 10.2 years to complete an orbit.

However, a follow-up study in 2024 found no evidence of this planet in radial velocity data from the HARPS-N spectrograph. In addition, astrometric data from the Gaia space telescope also shows no evidence of a companion, placing an upper limit on the mass of any planet at 5 AU consistent with the claimed minimum mass of planet b. The McDonald team stated that their data collected since 2012 is also no longer consistent with the claimed planet.
