= 87 Pegasi =

Variable Star in the constellation Pegasus

- Location of 87 Pegasi (circled in red)

Observation data Epoch J2000.0 Equinox ICRS
- Constellation: Pegasus
- Right ascension: 00^{h} 09^{m} 02.42^{s}
- Declination: +18° 12′ 43.1″
- Apparent magnitude (V): 5.53

Characteristics
- Evolutionary stage: horizontal branch
- Spectral type: G9III
- B−V color index: +1.04

Astrometry
Radial velocity (R_{v})	−19.85±0.13 km/s
Proper motion (μ)	RA: +140.876 mas/yr Dec.: −25.250 mas/yr
Parallax (π)	10.8284±0.0698 mas
Distance	301 ± 2 ly (92.3 ± 0.6 pc)
Absolute magnitude (M_{V})	+0.86

Details
Mass	1.81 M_{☉}
Radius	9.8 R_{☉}
Luminosity	56 L_{☉}
Surface gravity (log g)	2.70 cgs
Temperature	4,811 K
Metallicity [Fe/H]	+0.04 dex
Age	1.77 Gyr

Other designations
- 87 Pegasi, AG+17 13, BD+17 7, HD 448, HIP 729, HR 22, SAO 91734, PPM 116172, TIC 258877786, TYC 1181-1782-1, GCRV 68, GSC 01181-01782, IRAS 00064+1756, 2MASS J00090243+1812432, Gaia DR3 2797074778388646016

Database references
SIMBAD	data

87 Pegasi (also known as HD 448) is a red giant star located in the northern constellation of Pegasus. With an apparent visual magnitude of 5.56, it is faintly visible to the naked eye under dark skies but requires good conditions or binoculars for reliable observation.

== Observation ==
The star was observed in ultraviolet by NASA's GALEX satellite to find correlation between chromosphere and coronal activity with many other red giant stars.
