= 72 Pegasi =

Binary star system in the constellation Pegasus

- Location of 72 Pegasi (circled)

Observation data Epoch J2000 Equinox ICRS
- Constellation: Pegasus
- Right ascension: 23^{h} 33^{m} 57.18791^{s}
- Declination: +31° 19′ 31.0058″
- Apparent magnitude (V): 4.97

Characteristics
- Spectral type: K4IIIb
- U−B color index: +1.63
- B−V color index: +1.39
- Variable type: suspected

Astrometry
Radial velocity (R_{v})	−24.71 km/s
Proper motion (μ)	RA: +50.81 mas/yr Dec.: −17.46 mas/yr
Parallax (π)	5.94±0.45 mas
Distance	550 ± 40 ly (170 ± 10 pc)
Absolute magnitude (M_{V})	−1.15

Orbit
Period (P)	492.30 ± 75.96 a (179,811 ± 27,745 d)
Semi-major axis (a)	0.568 ± 0.065″
Eccentricity (e)	0.322 ± 0.047
Inclination (i)	21.7 ± 8.3°
Longitude of the node (Ω)	56.2 ± 6.0°
Periastron epoch (T)	MJD 16818 ± 3658
Argument of periastron (ω) (secondary)	293 ± 15°

Details
Mass	2 / 2 M_{☉}
Luminosity	554 L_{☉}
Surface gravity (log g)	2.00 cgs
Temperature	4,379 K
Metallicity [Fe/H]	+0.06 dex
Rotational velocity (v sin i)	1.4 km/s

Other designations
- 72 Peg, NSV 14617, BD+30°4978, GC 32772, HD 221673, HIP 116310, HR 8943, SAO 73341, CCDM J23340+3120AB, WDS J23340+3120AB

Database references
SIMBAD	data

72 Pegasi is a binary star system in the northern constellation of Pegasus. It is visible to the naked eye as a faint, orange-hued point of light with a combined apparent visual magnitude of 4.97. The system is located approximately 550 light years away from the Sun, based on parallax, but is drifting closer with a radial velocity of −25 km/s.

This is a visual binary with an orbital period of roughly 492 years and an eccentricity of 0.32. The two stars are relatively similar and are about twice the mass of the Sun each. The primary star, 72 Pegasi A, is an evolved K-type giant with a visual magnitude of 5.67. The companion, 72 Pegasi B, is another K-type giant with an apparent magnitude of 6.11, and a separation of about 0.568″ from the primary. 72 Pegasi B is thought to be a binary itself, with a brown dwarf companion in a 4.2-year period.
