= 32 Pegasi =

Star in the constellation Pegasus

- Location of 32 Pegasi (circled)

Observation data Epoch J2000 Equinox ICRS
- Constellation: Pegasus
- Right ascension: 22^{h} 21^{m} 19.33896^{s}
- Declination: 28° 19′ 49.8786″
- Apparent magnitude (V): 4.81 (4.83 + 8.86)

Characteristics
- Spectral type: B9III
- U−B color index: −0.19
- B−V color index: +0.00

Astrometry
Radial velocity (R_{v})	+11.40 km/s
Proper motion (μ)	RA: +17.426 mas/yr Dec.: +7.122 mas/yr
Parallax (π)	5.7814±0.3196 mas
Distance	560 ± 30 ly (173 ± 10 pc)
Absolute magnitude (M_{V})	−1.82

Details

32 Peg Aa
Luminosity	541 L_{☉}
Temperature	11,403 K
Rotational velocity (v sin i)	60 km/s

Other designations
- 32 Peg, BD+27°4299, GC 31253, HD 212097, HIP 110371, HR 8522, SAO 90440, CCDM J22213+2820AF, WDS J22213+2820Aa,Ab

Database references
SIMBAD	data

32 Pegasi is a binary star system in the northern constellation of Pegasus. It is visible to the naked eye as a faint, blue-white hued point of light with an apparent visual magnitude of 4.81 The system is located approximately 560 light years away from the Sun based on parallax, and is drifting further away with a radial velocity of +11.4 km/s.

The brighter member of this system, designated component Aa, has visual magnitude 4.83 with a stellar classification of B9III, matching a late B-type star with the luminosity class of a giant. It is spinning with a projected rotational velocity of 60 km/s, and is radiating 541 times the luminosity of the Sun from its photosphere at an effective temperature of 11,403 K.

The fainter secondary, component Ab, is of magnitude 8.86 with an angular separation of 0.50″ along a position angle of 288° from the primary, as of 2005. Visual companions include component B, at a 70.7″ separation from the primary and magnitude 10.73; C, at a separation from B of 3.2″ and magnitude 12.4; as well as D (separation from A of 42.8″ and magnitude 11.9) and E (separation from A of 58.3" and magnitude 11.9).
