= 31 Pegasi =

Star in the constellation Pegasus

- Location of 31 Pegasi (circled)

Observation data Epoch J2000 Equinox ICRS
- Constellation: Pegasus
- Right ascension: 22^{h} 21^{m} 31.07511^{s}
- Declination: 12° 12′ 18.6628″
- Apparent magnitude (V): 4.85 - 5.05

Characteristics
- Evolutionary stage: main sequence
- Spectral type: B2IV-Ve
- U−B color index: -0.81
- B−V color index: -0.10
- Variable type: γ Cas

Astrometry
Radial velocity (R_{v})	−5.30 km/s
Proper motion (μ)	RA: +6.32 mas/yr Dec.: +4.80 mas/yr
Parallax (π)	2.01±0.28 mas
Distance	approx. 1,600 ly (approx. 500 pc)
Absolute magnitude (M_{V})	−3.61

Details
Mass	12.5±0.7 M_{☉}
Radius	11.6 R_{☉}
Luminosity (bolometric)	27,925+4,360 −3,770 L_{☉}
Surface gravity (log g)	3.71±0.15 cgs
Temperature	23,890±740 K
Rotational velocity (v sin i)	98±8 km/s
Age	15.4±1.3 Myr

Other designations
- 31 Peg, IN Peg, BD+11°4784, FK5 843, GC 31255, HD 212076, HIP 110386, HR 8520, SAO 107854

Database references
SIMBAD	data

31 Pegasi is a single star in the northern constellation of Pegasus. It is visible to the naked eye as a dim, blue-white hued point of light with an apparent visual magnitude of about 5. It is located approximately 1,600 light years away from the Sun based on parallax, but is drifting closer with a radial velocity of −5.3 km/s.

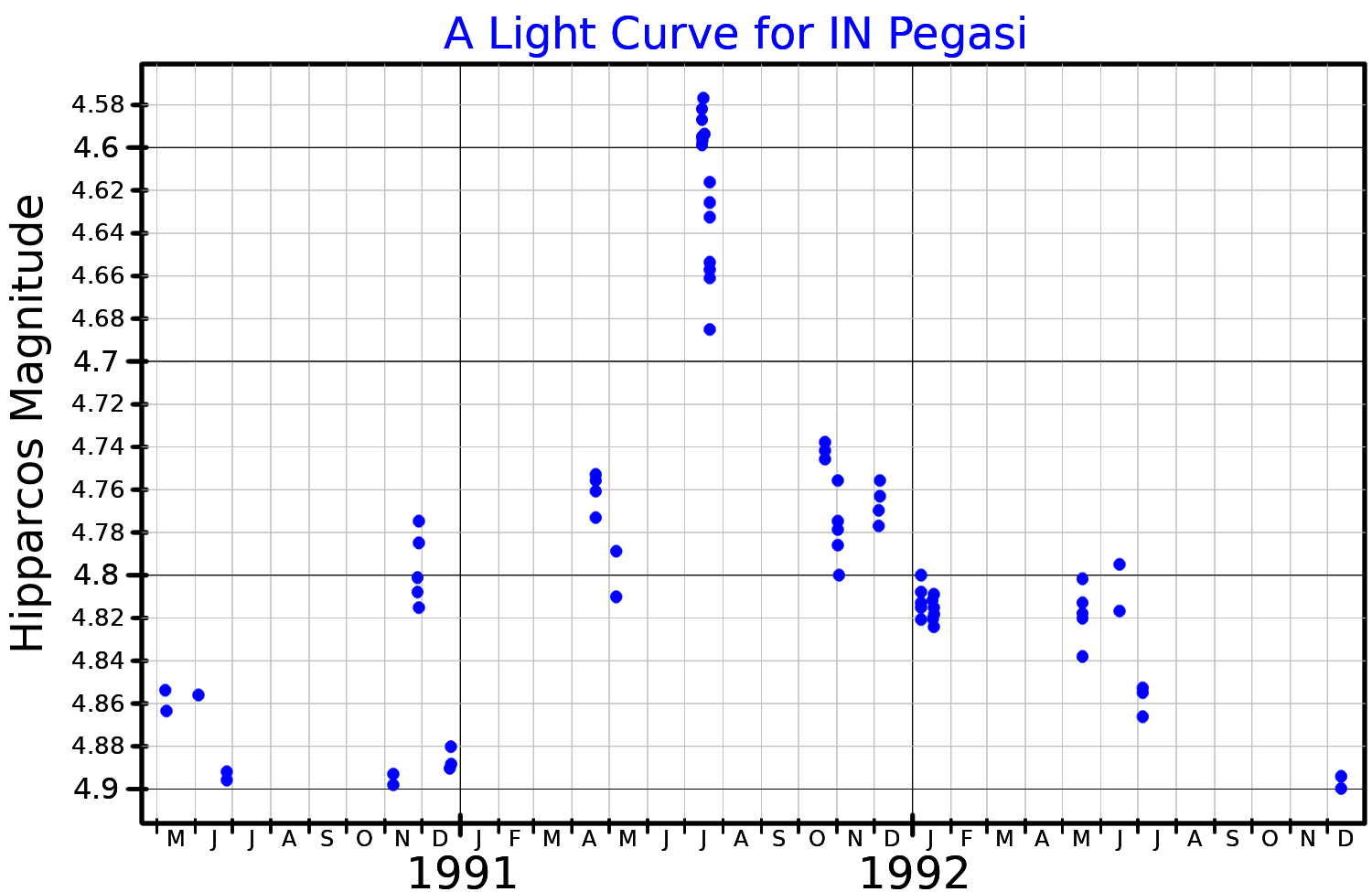
A light curve for IN Pegasi, plotted from Hipparcos data

This is a massive Be star with a stellar classification of B2IV-V. It is a γ Cas variable; a type of shell star with a circumstellar disc of gas surrounding the star at the equator, and ranges from 5.05 up to 4.85 in visual magnitude. It is spinning with a projected rotational velocity of 98 km/s, with the pole being inclined by an estimated angle of 26°±9° to the line of sight from the Earth. The star is 15.4 million years old with 12.5 times the mass of the Sun. It is radiating around 28,000 times the luminosity of the Sun from its photosphere at an effective temperature of 23,890 K.
