= 35 Pegasi =

Star in the constellation of Pegasus

- Location of 35 Pegasi (circled)

Observation data Epoch J2000 Equinox ICRS
- Constellation: Pegasus
- Right ascension: 22^{h} 27^{m} 51.52233^{s}
- Declination: +04° 41′ 44.3916″
- Apparent magnitude (V): 4.80

Characteristics
- Evolutionary stage: horizontal branch
- Spectral type: K0III
- U−B color index: +0.88
- B−V color index: +1.06

Astrometry
Radial velocity (R_{v})	+54.16 km/s
Proper motion (μ)	RA: +77.57 mas/yr Dec.: −306.12 mas/yr
Parallax (π)	21.0039±0.2419 mas
Distance	155 ± 2 ly (47.6 ± 0.5 pc)
Absolute magnitude (M_{V})	1.50

Details
Mass	1.18 M_{☉}
Radius	8.5 R_{☉}
Luminosity	31.69 L_{☉}
Surface gravity (log g)	2.76 cgs
Temperature	4,676 K
Metallicity [Fe/H]	−0.28 dex
Rotational velocity (v sin i)	1.5 km/s
Age	4.94 Gyr

Other designations
- 35 Peg, BD+03°4710, FK5 3796, GC 31377, HD 212943, HIP 110882, HR 8551, SAO 127540, CCDM J22278+0441A, WDS J22279+0442A, LTT 16582

Database references
SIMBAD	data

35 Pegasi is a single star in the northern constellation of Pegasus. It is visible to the naked eye as a faint, orange-hued point of light with an apparent visual magnitude of 4.80. The star is located approximately 155 light years away from the Sun based on parallax, and is drifting further away with a radial velocity of +54 km/s. The star has a relatively high proper motion, traversing the celestial sphere at the rate of 0.318 arc seconds per annum.

This is an aging giant star with a stellar classification of K0III, having exhausted the hydrogen at its core and expanded to 8.5 times the Sun's radius. It is a red clump giant, indicating it is on the horizontal branch and is generating energy through helium fusion at its core. The star is five billion years old with 1.2 times the mass of the Sun. It is radiating 32 times the Sun's luminosity from its enlarged photosphere at an effective temperature of 4,676 K.

There are two distant visual companions: component B, at an angular separation of 80.5″ and magnitude 10.0, and C, at separation 176.3″ and magnitude 10.64.
