= 2 Pegasi =

Star in the constellation Pegasus

- Location of 2 Pegasi (circled)

Observation data Epoch J2000 Equinox ICRS
- Constellation: Pegasus
- Right ascension: 21^{h} 29^{m} 56.89545^{s}
- Declination: 23° 38′ 19.8170″
- Apparent magnitude (V): 4.52

Characteristics
- Evolutionary stage: AGB
- Spectral type: M1+III
- U−B color index: +1.93
- B−V color index: +1.62

Astrometry
Radial velocity (R_{v})	−18.92 km/s
Proper motion (μ)	RA: +24.74 mas/yr Dec.: +3.63 mas/yr
Parallax (π)	8.28±0.18 mas
Distance	394 ± 9 ly (121 ± 3 pc)
Absolute magnitude (M_{V})	−0.89

Details
Mass	1.2 M_{☉}
Radius	55 R_{☉}
Luminosity	646 L_{☉}
Surface gravity (log g)	1.57 cgs
Temperature	3,921 K
Metallicity [Fe/H]	−0.16 dex

Other designations
- 2 Peg, NSV 25624, BD+23°4325, FK5 1565, GC 30109, HD 204724, HIP 106140, HR 8225, SAO 89752, CCDM J21299+2338A, WDS J21299+2338A

Database references
SIMBAD	data

2 Pegasi is a single star in the constellation Pegasus, located approximately 394 light years away from the Sun based on parallax. It is visible to the naked eye as a faint, red-hued star with an apparent visual magnitude of 4.52. The object is moving closer to the Earth with a heliocentric radial velocity of −19 km/s. It has a magnitude 12.7 visual companion, designated component B, at an angular separation of 30.4″.

This is an aging red giant star with a stellar classification of M1+III, currently on the asymptotic giant branch, having exhausted the hydrogen at its core and evolved away from the main sequence. The star has expanded to an estimated 55 times the radius of the Sun. It is radiating 646 times the luminosity of the Sun from its enlarged photosphere at an effective temperature of 3,921 K.

It is the 2nd star numbered by Flamsteed in order of right ascension. In the 1795 French-language Fortin-Flamsteed edition of the Atlas Coelestis, 2 Pegasi is labelled with the letter "f".
