= 12 Pegasi =

K-type supergiant star in the constellation of Pegasus

- Location of 12 Pegasi (circled)

Observation data Epoch J2000.0 Equinox J2000.0
- Constellation: Pegasus
- Right ascension: 21^{h} 46^{m} 04.364^{s}
- Declination: +22° 56′ 55.96″
- Apparent magnitude (V): +5.266

Characteristics
- Evolutionary stage: Supergiant
- Spectral type: K0IbHdel0.5
- U−B color index: +1.33
- B−V color index: +1.41

Astrometry
Radial velocity (R_{v})	−10.14±0.20 km/s
Proper motion (μ)	RA: 8.299 mas/yr Dec.: −2.478 mas/yr
Parallax (π)	2.3673±0.1279 mas
Distance	1,380 ± 70 ly (420 ± 20 pc)
Absolute magnitude (M_{V})	−4.03

Details
Mass	6.3 M_{☉}
Radius	81 R_{☉}
Luminosity	1,722–1,820 L_{☉}
Surface gravity (log g)	1.11 cgs
Temperature	4,185 K
Metallicity [Fe/H]	+0.03 dex
Rotational velocity (v sin i)	19.5 km/s
Age	19.8 Myr

Other designations
- 12 Peg, BD+22°4472, FK5 3739, GC 30479, HD 207089, HIP 107472, HR 8321, SAO 89962, PPM 113549

Database references
SIMBAD	data

12 Pegasi is a K-type supergiant star in the northern constellation of Pegasus. It is faintly visible to the naked eye with an apparent visual magnitude of +5.3. Based on parallax measurements, it is located at a distance of approximately 1,380 light-years (420 pc) from the Earth. The star is drifting closer with a line of sight velocity component of −10.1 km/s.

This evolved star has a spectral type of K0Ib Hdel0.5, which indicates that it is a less luminous K-type supergiant with strong H-δ Balmer lines. It is an estimated 20 million years old and is spinning with a projected rotational velocity of 19.5 km/s. With 6.3 times the mass of the Sun, it has expanded to 81 times the radius of the Sun. The star is radiating 1,722–1,820 times the luminosity of the Sun from its photosphere at an effective temperature of 4,185 K.
