= 56 Pegasi =

Star system in the constellation Pegasus

- Location of 56 Pegasi (circled)

Observation data Epoch J2000 Equinox ICRS
- Constellation: Pegasus
- Right ascension: 23^{h} 07^{m} 06.74189^{s}
- Declination: 25° 28′ 05.7739″
- Apparent magnitude (V): 4.74

Characteristics
- Evolutionary stage: red giant branch
- Spectral type: K0.5II:Ba1CN-2CH-0.5
- U−B color index: +1.14
- B−V color index: +1.32

Astrometry
Radial velocity (R_{v})	−27.55 km/s
Proper motion (μ)	RA: −2.747 mas/yr Dec.: −31.682 mas/yr
Parallax (π)	5.1778±0.1118 mas
Distance	630 ± 10 ly (193 ± 4 pc)
Absolute magnitude (M_{V})	−1.32

Orbit
Primary	56 Peg A
Name	56 Peg B
Period (P)	111.15±0.03 d
Semi-major axis (a)	0.79+0.10 −0.08 AU
Eccentricity (e)	0.072+0.048 −0.045
Inclination (i)	90+42 −41°
Longitude of the node (Ω)	90+60 −42°
Periastron epoch (T)	2455289+15 −85 HJD
Argument of periastron (ω) (secondary)	55+270 −37°
Semi-amplitude (K_{1}) (primary)	1.47±0.04 km/s

Orbit
Primary	56 Peg AB
Name	56 Peg C
Period (P)	15,200+2,600 −1,600 d
Semi-major axis (a)	22.1+3.6 −2.8 AU
Eccentricity (e)	0.39+0.13 −0.12
Inclination (i)	157+4 −5°
Longitude of the node (Ω)	153+14 −17°
Periastron epoch (T)	2469014±2800 HJD
Argument of periastron (ω) (secondary)	73+21 −24°

Details

56 Peg A
Mass	4.3±1.1 M_{☉}
Radius	41 R_{☉}
Luminosity	680 L_{☉}
Surface gravity (log g)	1.41 cgs
Temperature	4,185±85 K
Metallicity [Fe/H]	−0.38 dex
Rotational velocity (v sin i)	4.4 km/s
Age	229 Myr

56 Peg B
Mass	0.13+0.06 −0.03 M_{☉}

56 Peg C
Mass	0.85+0.25 −0.18 M_{☉}

Other designations
- 56 Peg, NSV 14429, BD+24°4716, FK5 3848, GC 32201, HD 218356, HIP 114155, HR 8796, SAO 91019, 2MASS J23070675+2528055

Database references
SIMBAD	data

56 Pegasi is a triple star system in the northern constellation of Pegasus. It is visible to the naked eye with a combined apparent visual magnitude of 4.74. The system is approximately 630 light years away from the Sun based on parallax, but is drifting closer with a radial velocity of −28 km/s. It is listed as a member of the Wolf 630 moving group.

== Characteristics ==
The variable radial velocity of this star was announced in 1911 by W. W. Campbell. The inner system, made up by the primary and secondary components, is a single-lined spectroscopic binary in a nearly circular orbit with a period of 111.15 days. The average separation between components is 0.79 astronomical units.

The primary component is a peculiar bright giant with a stellar classification of K0.5 II: Ba1 CN-2 CH-0.5. This notation indicates it is a K-type giant with some uncertainty about the classification, along with an overabundance of barium and underabundances of the CN and CH radicals. It is an active star, roughly 229 million years old, with 4.3 times the Sun's mass. The star has expanded to 41 times the radius of the Sun and is radiating 680 times the Sun's luminosity from its enlarged photosphere at an effective temperature of 4,185 K.

The secondary has a mass 0.13 times the mass of the Sun.

The tertiary component is a white dwarf with 0.85 times the mass of the Sun. This companion lost mass when it was an AGB star, causing s-process elements, produced by nucleosynthesis, to be transferred to the primary star, resulting in its current unusual abundances. This star has an orbital period of 41.6 years, a moderate eccentricity, and an average separation of 22 AU.

The system displays an excess of ultraviolet radiation that must be coming from the secondary. Simon et al. (1982) classified this object as a subdwarf O star. Alternatively, it may be a white dwarf companion with an accretion disk. Several puzzling features in the evolutionary history of this pair may be explained if the primary is a fast rotator being seen nearly pole-on. The star may have been spun up during a mass transfer episode with the secondary.

== Nomenclature ==
It is the 56th star numbered by Flamsteed in order of right ascension. In the 1795 French-language Fortin-Flamsteed edition of the Atlas Coelestis, 56 Pegasi is labelled with the letter "h".
