= 33 Pegasi =

Star in the constellation Pegasus

Observation data Epoch J2000 Equinox ICRS
- Constellation: Pegasus
- Right ascension: 22^{h} 23^{m} 39.565^{s}
- Declination: +20° 50′ 53.84″
- Apparent magnitude (V): 6.203 (6.391 + 9.287)

Characteristics
- Spectral type: F7 V
- B−V color index: 0.518±0.004

Astrometry
Radial velocity (R_{v})	23.8±0.4 km/s
Proper motion (μ)	RA: +333.057 mas/yr Dec.: −10.827 mas/yr
Parallax (π)	29.8125±0.0436 mas
Distance	109.4 ± 0.2 ly (33.54 ± 0.05 pc)
Absolute magnitude (M_{V})	3.55

Details

33 Peg A
Mass	1.28 M_{☉}
Radius	1.29+0.15 −0.14 R_{☉}
Luminosity	2.850+0.007 −0.008 L_{☉}
Surface gravity (log g)	4.29 cgs
Temperature	6,169 K
Metallicity [Fe/H]	−0.18 dex
Rotational velocity (v sin i)	6 km/s
Age	4.1 Gyr

33 Peg B
Mass	0.80 M_{☉}

Other designations
- 33 Peg, BD−16°4196, HD 212395, HIP 110548, HR 8532, SAO 90462, STF 2900, WDS J22237+2051, CCDM J22236+2051, ADS 15896

Database references
SIMBAD	data

33 Pegasi is the Flamsteed designation for a visual binary star (STF 2900) in the northern constellation of Pegasus. It has an apparent visual magnitude of 6.2, placing it near the limit of naked eye visibility. Measurements show an annual parallax shift of 0.0298125″, which is equivalent to a distance of 109 ly (33 pc) from the Sun. It is drifting further away with a radial velocity of 24 km/s.

The primary component of this system is a main sequence star with a visual magnitude of 6.4 and a stellar classification of F7 V. It is nearly as old as the Sun with an estimated age of 4.1 billion years, but has a lower abundance of elements other than hydrogen and helium. The star has approximately 1.3 times the mass and radius of the Sun, but releases almost 3 times as much energy. The stellar atmosphere has an effective temperature of 6,169 K, giving it the yellow-white glow of an F-type star.

The secondary, STF 2900 B (WDS J22237+2051B), has a visual magnitude of 9.3 and is located at an angular separation of 0.420 arc seconds along a position angle of 0.0°. The pair have a projected separation of 15.6 AU with an orbital period of about 250 years.
