= 34 Pegasi =

Star in the constellation Pegasus

Observation data Epoch J2000 Equinox J2000
- Constellation: Pegasus
- Right ascension: 22^{h} 26^{m} 37.37059^{s}
- Declination: +04° 23′ 37.6056″
- Apparent magnitude (V): 5.76

Characteristics
- Spectral type: F7V or F8IV−V + K4
- B−V color index: 0.519±0.005

Astrometry
Radial velocity (R_{v})	−13.5±0.2 km/s
Proper motion (μ)	RA: +307.781 mas/yr Dec.: +47.533 mas/yr
Parallax (π)	24.9028±0.1794 mas
Distance	131.0 ± 0.9 ly (40.2 ± 0.3 pc)
Absolute magnitude (M_{V})	2.85

Orbit
Primary	Aa
Companion	Ab
Period (P)	929.91±0.46 d
Semi-major axis (a)	9.5±0.3" (≥58.24±0.65 Gm)
Eccentricity (e)	0.4358±0.0062
Inclination (i)	94.0±5.1°
Longitude of the node (Ω)	101.6±4.6°
Periastron epoch (T)	53,293.9±3.2 HJD
Argument of periastron (ω) (secondary)	188.5±1.1°
Semi-amplitude (K_{1}) (primary)	5.060±0.054 km/s

Details

Aa
Mass	1.33 M_{☉}
Radius	2.25+0.07 −0.08 R_{☉}
Luminosity	6.7±0.1 L_{☉}
Surface gravity (log g)	3.92 cgs
Temperature	6,200+110 −100 K
Metallicity [Fe/H]	−0.04±0.02 dex
Rotational velocity (v sin i)	8.4±1.0 km/s
Age	3.22 Gyr

Ab
Mass	0.29 M_{☉}

Other designations
- BU 290, BD+03°4705, GJ 9782, HD 212754, HIP 110785, HR 8548, SAO 127529, WDS J22266+0424, BU 290

Database references
SIMBAD	data

34 Pegasi is a triple star system in the northern constellation of Pegasus. It has a yellow-white hue and is dimly visible to the naked eye with an apparent visual magnitude of 5.76. The system is located at a distance of 131 light years from the Sun based on parallax, but is drifting closer with a radial velocity of −13.5 km/s. It has been catalogued as a member of the Hyades Supercluster, although its membership status remains doubtful.

The innermost system is a single-lined spectroscopic binary with an orbital period of 2.55 years and an eccentricity of 0.44. The orbital plane of this pair is being viewed nearly edge-on, and has an angular semimajor axis of 9.5″. A third member of the system has a poorly-constrained 420 year orbit around the main pair. This star was discovered by Burnham in 1874, and the discovery code BU 290 was given to the double. As of 2015, it lies at an angular separation of 3.90±0.02 along a position angle of 226.2°±0.8° from the inner system.

The primary member, component Aa, is an F-type main-sequence star that is starting to evolve off the main sequence, with stellar classifications of F7V or F8IV−V, depending on the source. It is around three billion years old and is spinning with a projected rotational velocity of 8 km/s, with a measured rotation period of 12 days. The star has 1.3 times the mass of the Sun and 2.25 times the Sun's radius. It is radiating 6.7 times the luminosity of the Sun from its photosphere at an effective temperature of 6,200 K.

The secondary companion to the primary, component Ab, is most likely a red dwarf star with around 29% of the mass of the Sun. The tertiary member, component B, has 53% of the Sun's mass and a class of around K4.
