= 78 Pegasi =

Binary star system in the Pegasus constellation

- Location of 78 Pegasi (circled)

Observation data Epoch J2000 Equinox ICRS
- Constellation: Pegasus
- Right ascension: 23^{h} 43^{m} 59.48560^{s}
- Declination: +29° 21′ 41.2342″
- Apparent magnitude (V): 4.93 (5.07 / 8.10)

Characteristics
- Spectral type: K0III
- U−B color index: +0.63
- B−V color index: +0.96

Astrometry
Radial velocity (R_{v})	−8.33 km/s
Proper motion (μ)	RA: +71.10 mas/yr Dec.: -40.58 mas/yr
Parallax (π)	14.54±0.56 mas
Distance	224 ± 9 ly (69 ± 3 pc)
Absolute magnitude (M_{V})	0.75

Orbit
Period (P)	630.15 yr
Semi-major axis (a)	1.614″
Eccentricity (e)	0.112
Inclination (i)	60.64°
Longitude of the node (Ω)	172.55°
Periastron epoch (T)	B 2247.71
Argument of periastron (ω) (secondary)	241.27°

Details

78 Peg A
Mass	1.50 M_{☉}
Radius	10 R_{☉}
Luminosity	57.35 L_{☉}
Surface gravity (log g)	2.62 cgs
Temperature	4,898 K
Metallicity [Fe/H]	+0.01 dex
Rotational velocity (v sin i)	1.1 km/s

Other designations
- 78 Peg, BD+28°4627, GC 32954, HD 222842, HIP 117073, HR 8997, SAO 91457, CCDM J23440+2922AB, WDS J23440+2922AB

Database references
SIMBAD	data

78 Pegasi is a binary star system in the northern constellation of Pegasus. It is visible to the naked eye as a faint, orange-hued point of light with an apparent visual magnitude of 4.93. The system is located approximately 224 light years from the Sun based on parallax, but is drifting closer with a radial velocity of −8 km/s. The double-star nature of this system was discovered by A. G. Clark in 1862. The components of this system orbit each other over a 630-year period with an eccentricity of 0.11.

The primary member, designated component A, is a magnitude 5.07 giant star with a stellar classification of K0III, having exhausted the supply of hydrogen at its core and expanded to 10 times the Sun's radius. It is a red clump giant, which indicates it is on the horizontal branch and is generating energy through core helium fusion. It has 1.5 times the mass of the Sun and is radiating 57 times the Sun's luminosity from its enlarged photosphere at an effective temperature of 4,898 K. The secondary companion, component B, is magnitude 8.10.

It is the 78th star numbered by Flamsteed in order of right ascension. In the 1795 French-language Fortin-Flamsteed edition of the Atlas Coelestis, 56 Pegasi is labelled with the letter "i".
