= 55 Pegasi =

Star in the constellation of Pegasus

- Location of 55 Pegasi (circled)

Observation data Epoch J2000 Equinox ICRS
- Constellation: Pegasus
- Right ascension: 23^{h} 07^{m} 00.25899^{s}
- Declination: +09° 24′ 34.1741″
- Apparent magnitude (V): 4.51

Characteristics
- Evolutionary stage: AGB
- Spectral type: M1IIIab
- U−B color index: +1.88
- B−V color index: +1.58
- Variable type: suspected

Astrometry
Radial velocity (R_{v})	−5.34 km/s
Proper motion (μ)	RA: +6.41 mas/yr Dec.: −12.71 mas/yr
Parallax (π)	10.7831±0.2694 mas
Distance	302 ± 8 ly (93 ± 2 pc)
Absolute magnitude (M_{V})	−0.48

Details
Mass	1.61±0.13 M_{☉}
Radius	45.87+1.31 −1.38 R_{☉}
Luminosity	483.1±37.2 L_{☉}
Surface gravity (log g)	0.80 cgs
Temperature	3,994±50 K
Metallicity [Fe/H]	0.23 dex
Rotational velocity (v sin i)	3.8±1.5 km/s
Age	2.13±0.46 Gyr

Other designations
- 55 Peg, NSV 14428, BD+08°4997, FK5 1603, GC 32196, HD 218329, HIP 114144, HR 8795, SAO 127976

Database references
SIMBAD	data

55 Pegasi is a single star in the northern constellation of Pegasus. It is visible to the naked eye as a faint, reddish-hued point of light with a baseline apparent visual magnitude of 4.51. The star is located approximately 302 light years away from the Sun based on parallax, but it is moving closer with a radial velocity of −5 km/s.

This is an aging red giant star on the asymptotic giant branch with a stellar classification of M1IIIab, having exhausted the supply of hydrogen at its core then expanded to 46 times the Sun's radius. It is a suspected variable, with an observed magnitude that ranges from 4.50 down to 4.56. The star is around two billion years old with 1.6 times the mass of the Sun. It is radiating 483 times the luminosity of the Sun from its swollen photosphere at an effective temperature of 3,994 K.
