= Rho Pegasi =

Star in the constellation Pegasus

- Location of ρ Pegasi (circled)

Observation data Epoch J2000 Equinox ICRS
- Constellation: Pegasus
- Right ascension: 22^{h} 55^{m} 13.66706^{s}
- Declination: +08° 48′ 58.2387″
- Apparent magnitude (V): 4.90

Characteristics
- Spectral type: A1V
- U−B color index: +0.00
- B−V color index: +0.00

Astrometry
Radial velocity (R_{v})	−10.6±0.9 km/s
Proper motion (μ)	RA: +80.370 mas/yr Dec.: +13.282 mas/yr
Parallax (π)	11.9131±0.2232 mas
Distance	274 ± 5 ly (84 ± 2 pc)
Absolute magnitude (M_{V})	+0.01

Details
Mass	2.84 M_{☉}
Radius	3.1 R_{☉}
Luminosity	110 L_{☉}
Surface gravity (log g)	3.90 cgs
Temperature	9,484 K
Rotational velocity (v sin i)	107 km/s
Age	331 Myr

Other designations
- Leidian, ρ Peg, 50 Peg, BD+08°4961, GC 31963, HD 216735, HIP 113186, HR 8717, SAO 127839

Database references
SIMBAD	data

Rho Pegasi, Latinized from ρ Pegasi, also named Leidian, is a star in the northern constellation of Pegasus, near the southern constellation boundary with Pisces. This is a probable astrometric binary system, as determined by changes to the proper motion of the visible component. It has a white hue and is faintly visible to the naked eye with an apparent visual magnitude of 4.90. The system is located at a distance of approximately 274 light years from the Sun based on parallax, but it is drifting closer with a radial velocity of −10.6 km/s.

This visible component is an A-type main-sequence star with a stellar classification of A1V. The star is 331 million years old and is spinning with a projected rotational velocity of 107 km/s. It has 2.8 times the mass of the Sun and 3.1 times the Sun's radius. The star is radiating 110 times the luminosity of the Sun from its photosphere at an effective temperature of 9,484 K.

In Chinese astronomy, this star is part of the constellation Léi Diàn (Thunder and Lightning, 雷電). The IAU Working Group on Star Names adopted the name Leidian for this star on 13 August 2026, after this Chinese constellation.
