= Psi Pegasi =

Binary star system in the constellation Pegasus

- Location of ψ Pegasi (circled)

Observation data Epoch J2000 Equinox ICRS
- Constellation: Pegasus
- Right ascension: 23^{h} 57^{m} 45.52681^{s}
- Declination: +25° 08′ 29.0480″
- Apparent magnitude (V): 4.66

Characteristics
- Evolutionary stage: AGB
- Spectral type: M3III
- U−B color index: +1.66
- B−V color index: +1.59
- Variable type: suspected

Astrometry
Radial velocity (R_{v})	−6.59±0.23 km/s
Proper motion (μ)	RA: −35.24 mas/yr Dec.: −31.60 mas/yr
Parallax (π)	6.85±0.24 mas
Distance	480 ± 20 ly (146 ± 5 pc)
Absolute magnitude (M_{V})	–1.19

Orbit
Period (P)	55.06±11.31 yr
Semi-major axis (a)	0.170±0.016″
Eccentricity (e)	0.19±0.10
Inclination (i)	65.6±2.2°
Longitude of the node (Ω)	46.6±2.3°
Periastron epoch (T)	2,001.83±8.81
Argument of periastron (ω) (secondary)	159.7±11.9°

Details
Radius	98±6 R_{☉}
Luminosity	960 L_{☉}
Temperature	3,882 K

Other designations
- ψ Peg, 84 Pegasi, NSV 14777, BD+24°4865, FK5 1629, GC 33230, HD 224427, HIP 118131, HR 9064, SAO 91611, WDS J23578+2508AB

Database references
SIMBAD	data

Psi Pegasi, which is Latinized from ψ Pegasi, is a binary star system within the great square in the northern constellation of Pegasus. It has a red hue and is faintly visible to the naked eye with an apparent visual magnitude of 4.66. This object is located at a distance of approximately 476 light-years away from the Sun based on parallax, but is drifting closer with a radial velocity of −6.6 km/s.

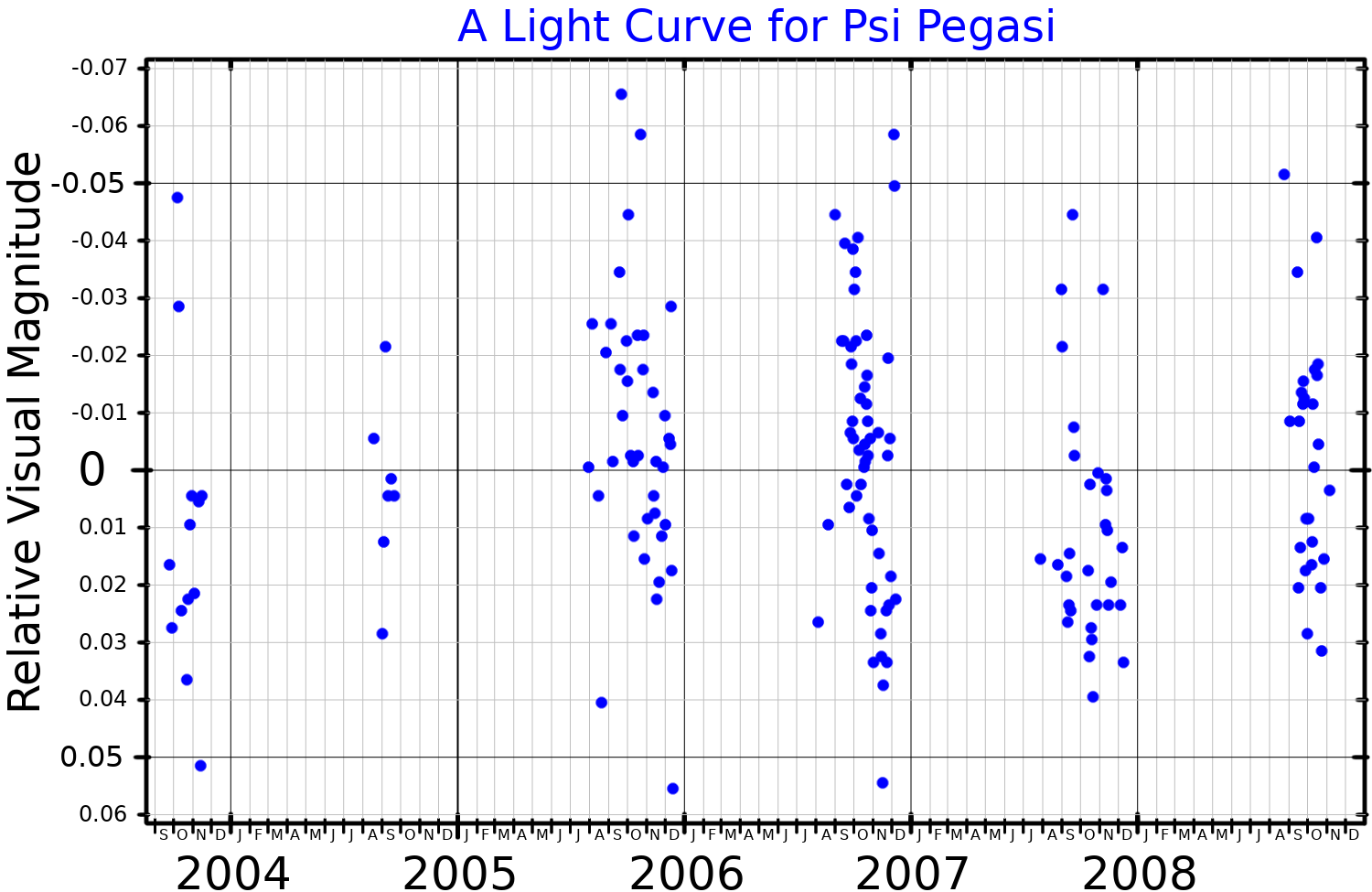
A visual band light curve for Psi Pegasi, plotted from data published by Tabur et al. (2009)

The orbital elements for this system were computed for the first time in 2004 based on interferometric observations, yielding an orbital period of roughly 55 years and an eccentricity of about 0.19. The visible component is an aging red giant star on the asymptotic giant branch with a stellar classification of M3III. It is a suspected variable, probably semiregular, with its magnitude varying from 4.63 to 4.69 over periods of 37.4 and 118.9 days. With the supply of hydrogen exhausted at its core, the star has cooled and expanded to around 98 times the Sun's radius. It is radiating 960 times the luminosity of the Sun from its bloated photosphere at an effective temperature of 3,882 K.
