= 70 Pegasi =

Binary star system in the constellation Pegasus

- Location of 70 Pegasi (circled in red)

Observation data Epoch J2000.0 Equinox ICRS
- Constellation: Pegasus
- Right ascension: 23^{h} 29^{m} 09.29698^{s}
- Declination: +12° 45′ 37.9918″
- Apparent magnitude (V): 4.56

Characteristics
- Spectral type: G8 IIIa
- B−V color index: 0.940

Astrometry
Radial velocity (R_{v})	−16.88±0.43 km/s
Proper motion (μ)	RA: +61.40 mas/yr Dec.: +24.82 mas/yr
Parallax (π)	18.65±0.78 mas
Distance	175 ± 7 ly (54 ± 2 pc)
Absolute magnitude (M_{V})	0.90

Orbit
Period (P)	941.03±0.12 d
Eccentricity (e)	0.713±0.006
Argument of periastron (ω) (secondary)	57.0±1.2°
Semi-amplitude (K_{1}) (primary)	3.16±0.04 km/s

Details

70 Peg A
Mass	2.49±0.06 M_{☉}
Radius	8.95±0.69 R_{☉}
Luminosity	49.2±2.4 L_{☉}
Surface gravity (log g)	2.92±0.05 cgs
Temperature	5,108±185 K
Metallicity [Fe/H]	0.05±0.03 dex
Rotational velocity (v sin i)	3.6 km/s
Age	590±40 Myr

Other designations
- 70 Peg, BD+11°5009, FK5 885, HD 221115, HIP 115919, HR 8923, SAO 108638

Database references
SIMBAD	data

70 Pegasi is a binary star system in the northern constellation Pegasus. It is a faint star, visible to the naked eye under good seeing conditions, with an apparent visual magnitude of 4.56. The measured annual parallax shift measured from Earth's orbit is 18.65 mas, yielding a distance estimate of around 175 light years. The visual magnitude of the star is diminished by an extinction of 0.07±0.02 due to interstellar dust. It is moving closer to the Sun with a radial velocity of −17 km/s.

This is a single-lined spectroscopic binary with an orbital period of 2.58 years (941 days) and a high eccentricity of 0.713. The visible component has a stellar classification of G8 IIIa, indicating it is an evolved G-type giant star. It is a probable red clump star, which would mean it is generating energy through helium fusion at its core. The star has 2.5 times the mass of the Sun and has expanded to nine times the Sun's radius. It is radiating about 49 times the Sun's luminosity from its enlarged photosphere at an effective temperature of 5,108 K.

The secondary is most likely a low mass main sequence star with no more than 0.4 times the mass of the Sun.
