= Pi1 Pegasi =

Star in the constellation Pegasus

Pi^{1} Pegasi
- Location of π^{1} Pegasi (circled)

Observation data Epoch J2000.0 Equinox ICRS
- Constellation: Pegasus
- Right ascension: 22^{h} 09^{m} 13.61893^{s}
- Declination: +33° 10′ 20.4778″
- Apparent magnitude (V): +5.58

Characteristics
- Spectral type: G8IIIb
- B−V color index: +0.985±0.003

Astrometry
Radial velocity (R_{v})	+5.1±0.9 km/s
Proper motion (μ)	RA: −48.117 mas/yr Dec.: −73.408 mas/yr
Parallax (π)	10.2111±0.1137 mas
Distance	319 ± 4 ly (98 ± 1 pc)
Absolute magnitude (M_{V})	0.84

Details
Radius	11.00+0.51 −0.83 R_{☉}
Luminosity	62.8±0.8 L_{☉}
Surface gravity (log g)	2.7 cgs
Temperature	4,898+196 −110 K
Metallicity [Fe/H]	−0.22 dex
Rotational velocity (v sin i)	4 km/s

Other designations
- π^{1} Peg, 27 Pegasi, BD+32°4349, HD 210354, HIP 109352, HR 8449, SAO 72064

Database references
SIMBAD	data

Pi^{1} Pegasi, Latinized from π^{1} Pegasi, is a star in the constellation Pegasus. Based upon changes to the proper motion of the visible component, this is a probable astrometric binary. It has a yellow hue and is dimply visible to the naked eye with a combined apparent visual magnitude of +5.58. The system is located approximately 319 light years distant from the Sun based on parallax, and is drifting further away with a radial velocity of +5 km/s.

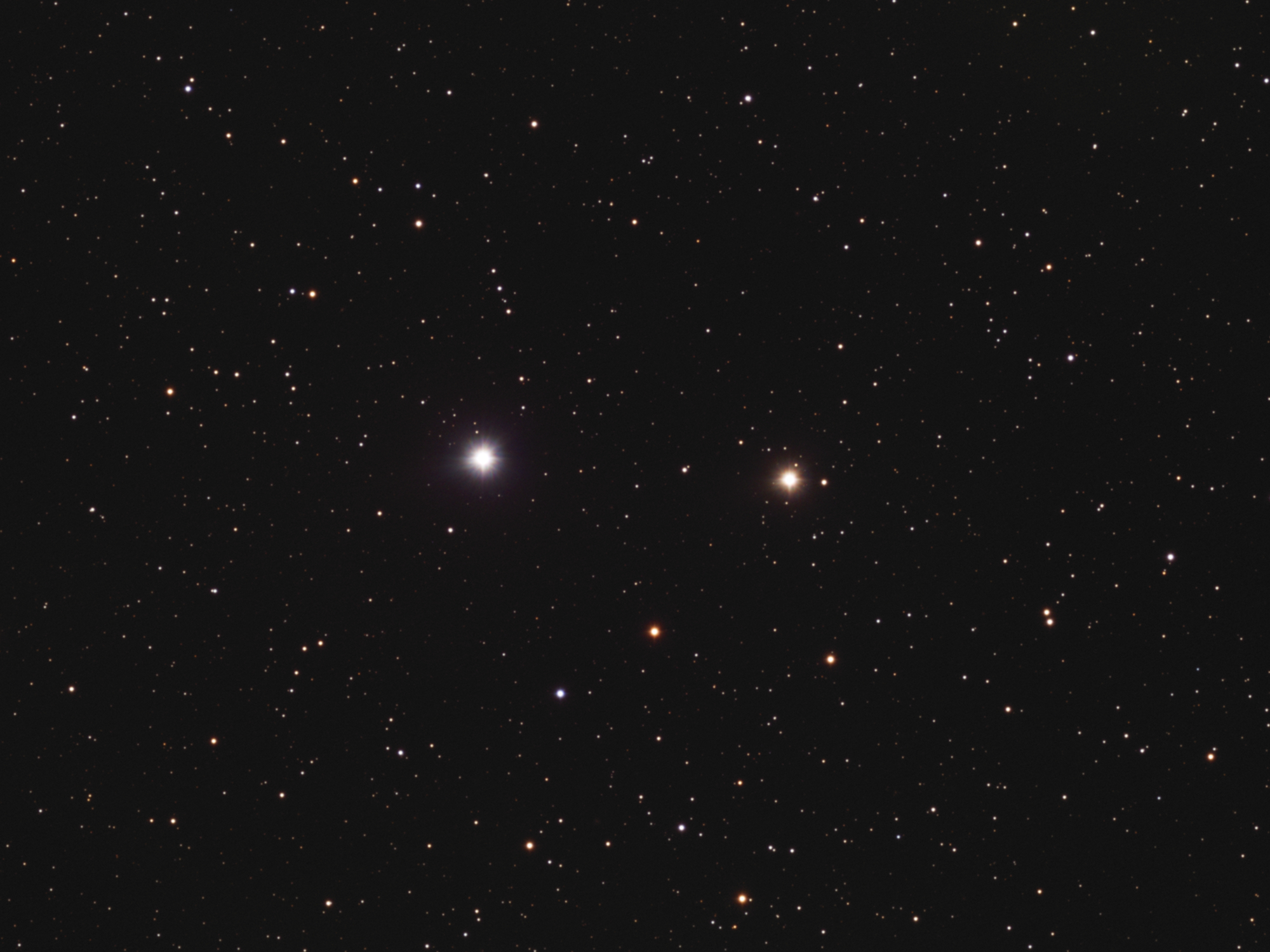
π^{1} Pegasi (right) and π^{2} Pegasi (left) in optical light

The visible component is an aging giant star with a stellar classification of G8IIIb. With the supply of hydrogen exhausted at its core, the star has cooled and expanded to 11 times the Sun's radius. It is radiating 63 times the luminosity of the Sun from its enlarged photosphere at an effective temperature of 4,898 K.
