= Pi2 Pegasi =

Single star in the constellation Pegasus

π^{2} Pegasi
- Location of π^{2} Pegasi (circled)

Observation data Epoch J2000.0 Equinox ICRS
- Constellation: Pegasus
- Right ascension: 22^{h} 09^{m} 59.24371^{s}
- Declination: +33° 10′ 41.5976″
- Apparent magnitude (V): +4.28

Characteristics
- Spectral type: F5 III
- B−V color index: 0.471±0.012

Astrometry
Radial velocity (R_{v})	+5.1±0.9 km/s
Proper motion (μ)	RA: −12.87±0.12 mas/yr Dec.: −18.95±0.16 mas/yr
Parallax (π)	12.40±0.17 mas
Distance	263 ± 4 ly (81 ± 1 pc)
Absolute magnitude (M_{V})	0.21

Details
Mass	2.48 M_{☉}
Radius	8.5±0.8 R_{☉}
Luminosity	102.9±2.6 L_{☉}
Temperature	6,300+298 −263 K
Rotational velocity (v sin i)	139.7 km/s
Age	530 Myr

Other designations
- Neichu, π^{2} Peg, 29 Pegasi, BD+32°4352, FK5 835, HD 210459, HIP 109410, HR 8454, SAO 72077

Database references
SIMBAD	data

Pi^{2} Pegasi, also named Neichu, is a single star in the northern constellation Pegasus. It is yellow-white in hue and visible to the naked eye as a faint point of light with an apparent visual magnitude of +4.28. The distance to this object is approximately 263 light years based on parallax, and it is drifting further away with a radial velocity of +5 km/s. This star is an outlying member of the Ursa Major Moving Group.

== Nomenclature ==
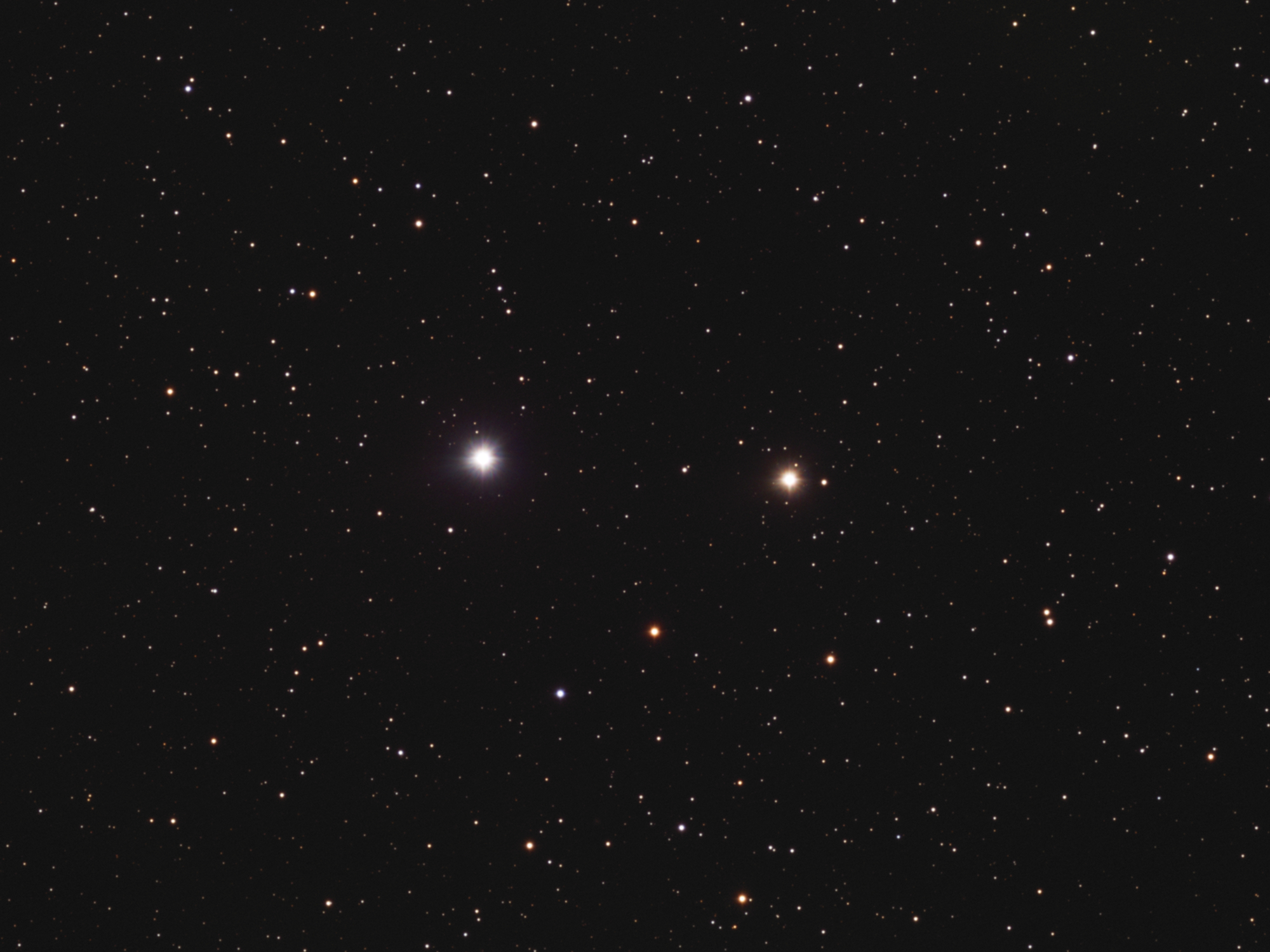
π^{1} Pegasi (right) and π^{2} Pegasi (left) in optical light

π^{2} Pegasi, Latinized as Pi^{2} Pegasi, is the star's Bayer designation; it is sometimes just called π Pegasi. In Chinese astronomy, this star is part of the constellation Nèichǔ (Inner Pestle, 內杵). The IAU Working Group on Star Names adopted the name Neichu for this star on 13 August 2026, after this Chinese constellation.

== Properties ==
This object has a stellar classification of F5 III, matching an aging giant star that has exhausted the supply of hydrogen at its core then cooled and expanded off the main sequence. At present it has 8.5 times the radius of the Sun. The star is 530 million years old with 2.48 times the Sun's mass. It shows a high rotation rate considering its evolutionary status, with a projected rotational velocity of 140 km/s. The star has been noted as a possible variable shell star. Pi^{2} Pegasi is radiating 103 times the Sun's luminosity from its swollen photosphere at an effective temperature of 6,300 K.
