= Pegasus (constellation) =

Constellation in the northern celestial hemisphere

- Constellation
- List of stars in Pegasus
- Abbreviation: Peg
- Genitive: Pegasi
- Pronunciation: /ˈpɛɡəsəs/, genitive /ˈpɛɡəsaɪ/
- Symbolism: the Winged Horse
- Right ascension: 21^{h} 12.6^{m} –00^{h} 14.6^{m}
- Declination: +2.33°–+36.61°
- Quadrant: NQ4
- Area: 1121 sq. deg. (7th)
- Main stars: 9, 17
- Bayer/Flamsteed stars: 88
- Stars brighter than 3.00^{m}: 5
- Stars within 10.00 pc (32.62 ly): 4
- Brightest star: ε Peg (Enif) (2.38^{m})
- Nearest star: WISE J2209+2711
- Messier objects: 1
- Meteor showers: July Pegasids
- Bordering constellations: Andromeda; Lacerta; Cygnus; Vulpecula; Delphinus; Equuleus; Aquarius; Pisces
- Visible at latitudes between +90° and −54°. Best visible at 21:00 (9 p.m.) during the month of October.

Pegasus is a constellation in the northern sky, named after the winged horse Pegasus in Greek mythology. It was one of the 48 constellations listed by the 2nd-century astronomer Ptolemy, and is one of the 88 constellations recognized today. It lies just north of the celestial equator.

With an apparent magnitude varying between 2.37 and 2.45, the brightest star in Pegasus is the orange supergiant Epsilon Pegasi, also known as Enif, which marks the horse's muzzle. Alpha (Markab), Beta (Scheat), and Gamma (Algenib), together with Alpha Andromedae (Alpheratz) form the large asterism known as the Square of Pegasus. Twelve star systems have been found to have exoplanets.

51 Pegasi was the first Sun-like star discovered to have an exoplanet companion. It is just over 50 light years distant from earth.

== Mythology ==
The Babylonian constellation IKU (field) had four stars of which three were later part of the Greek constellation Hippos (Pegasus). Pegasus, in Greek mythology, was a winged horse with magical powers. One myth regarding his powers says that his hooves dug out a spring, Hippocrene, which blessed those who drank its water with the ability to write poetry. Pegasus was born when Perseus cut off the head of Medusa, who was impregnated by the god Poseidon. He was born with Chrysaor from Medusa's blood. Eventually, it became the horse for Bellerophon, who was asked to kill the Chimera and succeeded with the help of Athena and Pegasus.

Despite this success, after the death of his children, Bellerophon asked Pegasus to take him to Mount Olympus. Though Pegasus agreed, he plummeted back to Earth after Zeus either threw a thunderbolt at him or sent a gadfly to make Pegasus buck him off.

Persia recognized the constellation. Pegasus was depicted by al-Sufi in the tenth century as a complete horse facing east. This was unlike most other uranographers, who had depicted Pegasus as half of a horse, rising out of the ocean. In al-Sufi's depiction, Pegasus's head is made up of the stars of Lacerta the lizard. Its right foreleg is represented by β Peg and its left foreleg is represented by η Peg, μ Peg, and λ Peg; its hind legs are marked by 9 Peg. The back is represented by π Peg and μ Cyg, and the belly is represented by ι Peg and κ Peg.

In Chinese astronomy, the modern constellation of Pegasus lies in The Black Tortoise of the north (北方玄武), where the stars were classified in several separate asterisms of stars. Epsilon and Theta Pegasi are joined with Alpha Aquarii to form Wei 危 "rooftop", with Theta forming the roof apex.

In Hindu astronomy, Pegasus is contained within the 25th nakshatra lunar mansion Purva Bhadrapada. More specifically, it represented a bedstead that was a resting place for the Moon.

For the Warrau and Arawak peoples in Guyana the stars in the Great Square, corresponding to parts of Pegasus and of Andromeda, represented a barbecue, taken up to the sky by the seven hunters of the myth of Siritjo.

== Characteristics ==
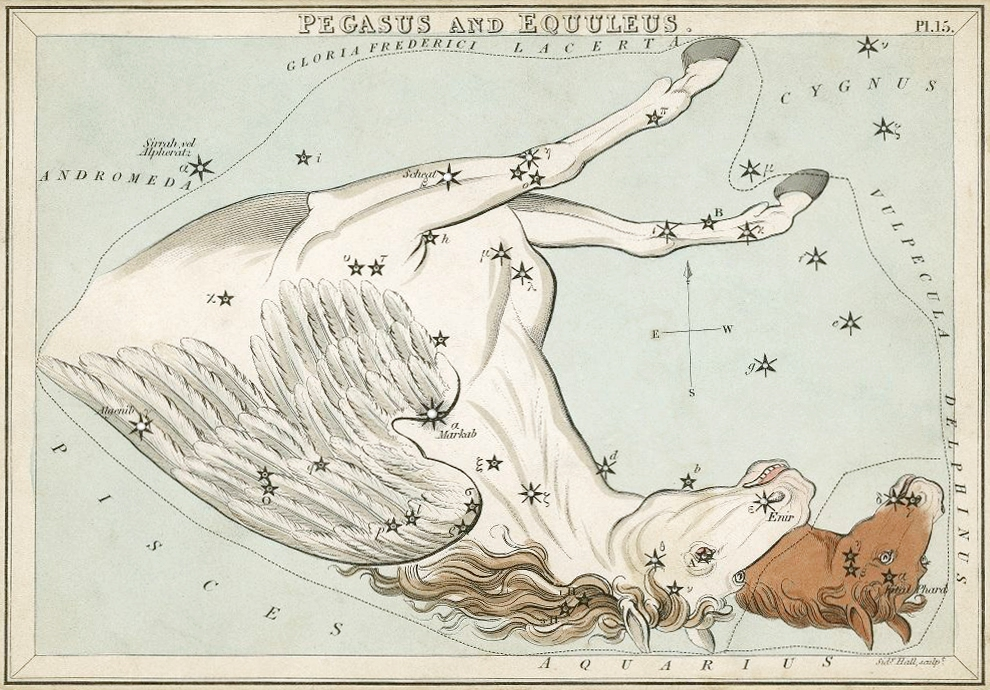
Pegasus with the foal Equuleus next to it, as depicted in Urania's Mirror, a set of constellation cards published in London c.1825. The horses appear upside-down in relation to the constellations around them. Like Taurus, Pegasus itself typically represents only the front half of the horse.

Covering 1121 square degrees, Pegasus is the seventh-largest of the 88 constellations. Pegasus is bordered by Andromeda to the north and east, Lacerta to the north, Cygnus to the northwest, Vulpecula, Delphinus and Equuleus to the west, Aquarius to the south and Pisces to the south and east. The three-letter abbreviation for the constellation, as adopted by the IAU in 1922, is "Peg".

The official constellation boundaries, as set by Belgian astronomer Eugène Delporte in 1930, are defined as a polygon of 35 segments. In the equatorial coordinate system the right ascension coordinates of these borders lie between 21^{h} 12.6^{m} and 00^{h} 14.6^{m} , while the declination coordinates are between 2.33° and 36.61°. Its position in the Northern Celestial Hemisphere means that the whole constellation is visible to observers north of 53°S. (Note: While parts of the constellation technically rise above the horizon to observers between the 53°S and 87°S, stars within a few degrees of the horizon are to all intents and purposes unobservable.)

Pegasus is dominated by a roughly square asterism (the Square of Pegasus). One of the stars, formerly known as Delta Pegasi or Sirrah, is now officially assigned to Andromeda and is known as Alpha Andromedae or Alpheratz. Traditionally, the body of the horse consists of a quadrilateral formed by the stars α Peg, β Peg, γ Peg, and α And. The front legs of the winged horse are formed by two crooked lines of stars: one from η Peg to κ Peg and the other from μ Peg to 1 Pegasi. Another crooked line of stars from α Peg via θ Peg to ε Peg forms the neck and head; ε is the snout.

== Features ==
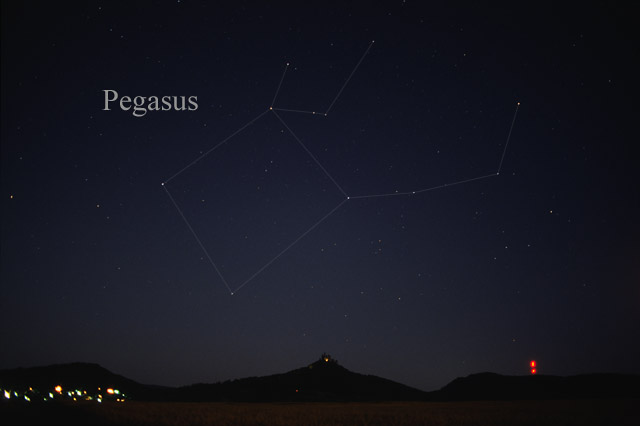
The constellation Pegasus as it can be seen by the naked eye

=== Stars ===
Bayer catalogued what he counted as 23 stars in the constellation, giving them the Bayer designations Alpha to Psi. He saw Pi Pegasi as one star, and was uncertain of its brightness, wavering between magnitude 4 and 5. Flamsteed labelled this star 29 Pegasi, but Bode concluded that the stars 27 and 29 Pegasi should be Pi^{1} and Pi^{2} Pegasi and that Bayer had seen them as a single star. Flamsteed added lower case letters e through to y, omitting A to D as they had been used on Bayer's chart to designate neighbouring constellations and the equator. He numbered 89 stars (now with Flamsteed designations), though 6 and 11 turned out to be stars in Aquarius. Within the constellation's borders there are 177 stars of apparent magnitude 6.5 or greater. (Note: Objects of magnitude 6.5 are among the faintest visible to the unaided eye in suburban-rural transition night skies.)

Epsilon Pegasi, also known as Enif, marks the horse's muzzle. The brightest star in Pegasus, is an orange supergiant of spectral type K21b that is around 12 times as massive as the Sun and is around 690 light-years distant from Earth. It is an irregular variable, its apparent magnitude varying between 2.37 and 2.45. Lying near Enif is AG Pegasi, an unusual star that brightened to magnitude 6.0 around 1885 before dimming to magnitude 9. It is composed of a red giant and white dwarf, estimated to be around 2.5 and 0.6 times the mass of the Sun respectively. With its outburst taking over 150 years, it has been described as the slowest nova ever recorded.

Three stars with Bayer designations that lie within the Great Square are variable stars. Phi and Psi Pegasi are pulsating red giants, while Tau Pegasi (the proper name is Salm), is a Delta Scuti variable—a class of short period (six hours at most) pulsating stars that have been used as standard candles and as subjects to study astroseismology. Rotating rapidly with a projected rotational velocity of 150 km s^{−1}, Kerb is almost 30 times as luminous as the Sun and has a pulsation period of 56.5 minutes. With an outer atmosphere at an effective temperature of 7,762 K, it is a white star with a spectral type of A5IV.

Zeta, Xi, Rho and Sigma Pegasi mark the horse's neck. The brightest of these with a magnitude of 3.4 is Zeta, also traditionally known as Homam. Lying seven degrees southwest of Markab, it is a blue-white main sequence star of spectral type B8V located around 209 light-years distant. It is a slowly pulsating B star that varies slightly in luminosity with a period of 22.952 ± 0.804 hours, completing 1.04566 cycles per day. Xi lies 2 degrees northeast, and is a yellow-white main sequence star of spectral type F6V that is 86% larger and 17% more massive that the Sun, and radiate 4.5 times the solar luminosity. It has a red dwarf companion that is 192.3 au distant. If (as is likely) the smaller star is in orbit around the larger star, then it would take around 2000 years to complete a revolution. Theta Pegasi marks the horse's eye. Also known as Biham, it is a 3.43-magnitude white main sequence star of spectral type A2V, around 1.8 times as massive, 24 times as luminous, and 2.3 times as wide as the Sun.

Alpha (Markab), Beta (Scheat), and Gamma (Algenib), together with Alpha Andromedae (Alpheratz or Sirrah) form the large asterism known as the Square of Pegasus. The brightest of these, Alpheratz was also known as both Delta Pegasi and Alpha Andromedae before being placed in Andromeda in 1922 with the setting of constellation boundaries. The second brightest star is Scheat, a red giant of spectral type M2.5II-IIIe located around 196 light-years away from Earth. It has expanded until it is some 95 times as large, and has a total luminosity 1,500 times that of the Sun. Beta Pegasi is a semi-regular variable that varies from magnitude 2.31 to 2.74 over a period of 43.3 days. Markab and Algenib are blue-white stars of spectral types B9III and B2IV located 133 and 391 light-years distant respectively. Appearing to have moved off the main sequence as their core hydrogen supply is being or has been exhausted, they are enlarging and cooling to eventually become red giant stars. Markab has an apparent magnitude of 2.48, while Algenib is a Beta Cephei variable that varies between magnitudes 2.82 and 2.86 every 3 hours 38 minutes, and also exhibits some slow pulsations every 1.47 days.

Eta and Omicron Pegasi mark the left knee and Pi Pegasi the left hoof, while Iota and Kappa Pegasi mark the right knee and hoof. Also known as Matar, Eta Pegasi is the fifth-brightest star in the constellation. Shining with an apparent magnitude of 2.94, it is a multiple star system composed of a yellow giant of spectral type G2 and a yellow-white main sequence star of spectral type A5V that are 3.2 and 2.0 times as massive as the Sun. The two revolve around each other every 2.24 years. Farther afield is a binary system of two G-type main sequence stars, that would take 170,000 years to orbit the main pair if they are in fact related. Omicron Pegasi has a magnitude of 4.79. Located 300 ± 20 light-years distant from Earth, it is a white subgiant that has begun to cool, expand and brighten as it exhausts its core hydrogen fuel and moves off the main sequence. Pi^{1} and Pi^{2} Pegasi appear as an optical double to the unaided eye as they are separated by 10 arcminutes, and are not a true binary system. Located 289 ± 8 light-years distant, Pi^{1} is an ageing yellow giant of spectral type G6III, 1.92 times as massive and around 200 times as luminous as the Sun. Pi^{2} is a yellow-white subgiant that is 2.5 times as massive as the Sun and has expanded to 8 times the Sun's radius and brightened to 92 times the Sun's luminosity. It is surrounded by a circumstellar disk spinning at 145 km a second, and is 263 ± 4 light-years distant from Earth.

IK Pegasi is a close binary comprising an A-type main-sequence star and white dwarf in very close orbit; the latter a candidate for a future type Ia supernova as its main star runs out of core hydrogen fuel and expands into a giant and transfers material to the smaller star.

Twelve star systems have been found to have exoplanets. 51 Pegasi was the first Sun-like star discovered to have an exoplanet companion; 51 Pegasi b (unofficially named Bellerophon, officially named Dimidium) is a hot Jupiter close to its star, completing an orbit every four days. Spectroscopic analysis of HD 209458 b, an extrasolar planet in this constellation, has provided the first evidence of atmospheric water vapor beyond the Solar System, while extrasolar planets orbiting the star HR 8799 also in Pegasus are the first to be directly imaged. V391 Pegasi is a hot subdwarf star that has been found to have a planetary companion.

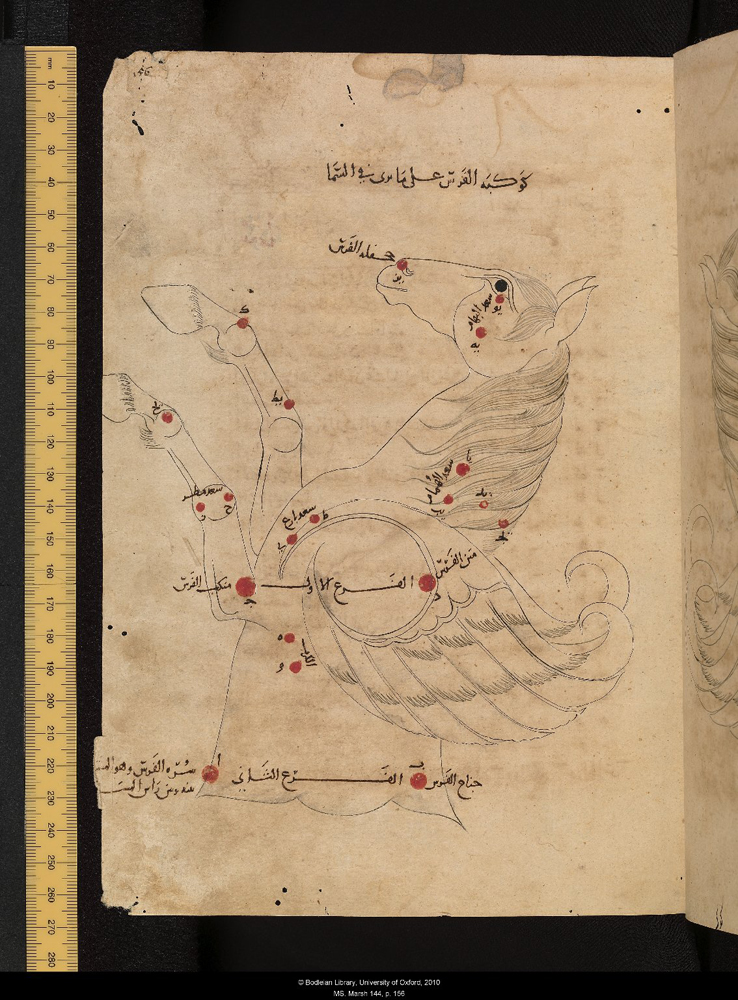
Pegasus from Al-Sufi's Book of Fixed Stars, dated 1009-10

=== Named stars ===
Name	Bayer designation	Origin	Meaning	Light Years
Markab	α	Arabic	the saddle of the horse	133
Scheat	β	Arabic	the upper arm	196
Algenib	γ	Arabic	the side / wing	391
Enif	ε	Arabic	nose	690
Homam	ζ	Arabic	man of high spirit	204
Matar	η	Arabic	lucky rain of shooting stars	167
Biham	θ	Arabic	the livestocks	67
Jiu	ι	Chinese	Mortar	38.5
Ligong	λ	Chinese	Secondary Palace	365
Sadalbari	μ	Arabic	luck star of the splendid one	113
Tugongli	ξ	Chinese	Clerks of the Earth Official	53.2
Neichu	π^{2}	Chinese	Inner Pestle	263
Leidian	ρ	Chinese	Thunder and Lightning	274
Salm	τ	Arabic	the leathern bucket	162
Alkarab	υ	Arabic	the bucket-rope	170

=== Deep-sky objects ===
Stephan's Quintet photographed by the James Webb Space Telescope

M15 (NGC 7078) is a globular cluster of magnitude 6.4, 34,000 light-years from Earth. It is a Shapley class IV cluster, which means that it is fairly rich and concentrated towards its center. M15 was discovered in 1746 by Jean-Dominique Maraldi. Pease 1 is a planetary nebula located within the globular cluster and was the first planetary nebula known to exist within a globular cluster. It has an apparent magnitude of 15.5.

NGC 7331 is a spiral galaxy located in Pegasus, 38 million light-years distant with a redshift of 0.0027. It was discovered by musician-astronomer William Herschel in 1784 and was later one of the first nebulous objects to be described as "spiral" by William Parsons. Another of Pegasus's galaxies is NGC 7742, a Type 2 Seyfert galaxy. Located at a distance of 77 million light-years with a redshift of 0.00555, it is an active galaxy with a supermassive black hole at its core. Its characteristic emission lines are produced by gas moving at high speeds around the central black hole.

Pegasus is also noted for its more unusual galaxies and exotic objects. Einstein's Cross is a quasar that has been lensed by a foreground galaxy. The elliptical galaxy is 400 million light-years away with a redshift of 0.0394, but the quasar is 8 billion light-years away. The lensed quasar resembles a cross because the gravitational force of the foreground galaxy on its light creates four images of the quasar. Stephan's Quintet is another unique object located in Pegasus. It is a cluster of five galaxies at a distance of 300 million light-years and a redshift of 0.0215. First discovered by Édouard Stephan, a Frenchman, in 1877, the Quintet is unique for its interacting galaxies. Two of the galaxies in the middle of the group have clearly moms to collide, sparking massive bursts of star formation and drawing off long "tails" of stars. Astronomers have predicted that all five galaxies may eventually merge into one large elliptical galaxy.

== Namesakes ==
USS Pegasus (AK-48) and USS Pegasus (PHM-1) are United States navy ships named after the constellation "Pegasus".

The Beyblade top Storm Pegasus 105RF and its evolutions Galaxy Pegasus W105R2F and Cosmic Pegasus F:D are based on Pegasus constellation.

Pegasus Seiya, main character from the manga and anime Saint Seiya, was named after the constellation Pegasus.

== See also ==
- Pegasus (Chinese astronomy)
