= Matar =

Matar may refer to:

== Deity ==
- Matar, a Phrygian goddess who flourished in Lydia (now Turkey) 1200 to 600 B.C., also known as Materan, Matar Kubileya, or Kubeleya, Cybele, as well as Great Goddess, The Mother, Mother of the Gods, The Great Mother, Magna Mater, and other related titles in many ancient cultures adopting the deity

== People ==
=== Given name ===
- Matar Coly (born 1984), Senegalese footballer
- Matar Fall (born 1982), French-born Senegalese footballer
- Matar Sène (born 1970), Senegalese wrestler

=== Surname ===
- Agapius II Matar (1736–1812), Patriarch of the Melkite Greek Catholic Church
- Ahmad Abu Matar (born 1944), Palestinian academic and writer
- Ahmed Matar (born 1954), Iraqi poet
- Amira Hilmi Matar (born 1930), Egyptian scholar and writer
- Athanasius V Matar, Patriarch of the Melkite Greek Catholic Church in 1813
- Ghiath Matar (1986–2011), Syrian activist
- Hadi Matar (born 1997), convicted assassin, stabbing of Salman Rushdie
- Hisham Matar (born 1970), American and Libyan author
- Ismail Matar (born 1983), Emirati footballer
- Maryam Matar (born 1975), Emirati geneticist and medical researcher
- Matar Matar (born 1976), Bahraini politician
- Muhammad Afifi Matar (1935–2010), Egyptian poet
- Nader Matar (born 1992), Lebanese footballer
- Nadia Matar (born 1966), Belgian-born Israeli activist
- Paul Youssef Matar (born 1941), Archeparch of the Maronite Catholic Archeparchy of Beirut
- Salim Matar, Iraqi nationalist and novelist
- Selim Matar (born 1956), Swiss writer, novelist and sociologist of Iraqi descent
- Yasser Matar (born 1985), Emirati footballer

== Other uses ==
- Matar, another name for the star Eta Pegasi
- USS Matar, Crater-class cargo ship commissioned by the U.S. Navy for service in World War II
- Matar, Kheda, a village in Gujarat, India

== See also ==
- Mattar, a surname
