= Tau Pegasi =

Star in the constellation Pegasus

- Location of τ Pegasi (circled)

Observation data Epoch J2000.0 Equinox ICRS
- Constellation: Pegasus
- Right ascension: 23^{h} 20^{m} 38.24188^{s}
- Declination: +23° 44′ 25.2098″
- Apparent magnitude (V): +4.58

Characteristics
- Spectral type: A5 Vp; A8V(n)kA5mA5 (λ Boo)
- U−B color index: +0.13
- B−V color index: +0.17
- Variable type: δ Sct

Astrometry
Radial velocity (R_{v})	+15.20±1.6 km/s
Proper motion (μ)	RA: 29.45±0.33 mas/yr Dec.: −9.53±0.27 mas/yr
Parallax (π)	20.17±0.40 mas
Distance	162 ± 3 ly (49.6 ± 1.0 pc)
Absolute magnitude (M_{V})	1.10

Details
Mass	2.14 M_{☉}
Radius	2.8 R_{☉}
Luminosity	32 L_{☉}
Surface gravity (log g)	3.88 cgs
Temperature	7,709 K
Metallicity [Fe/H]	−0.28 dex
Rotational velocity (v sin i)	149 km/s

Other designations
- Salm, 62 Pegasi, BD+22°4810, FK5 880, GC 32503, HIP 115250, HR 8880, HD 220061, SAO 91186

Database references
SIMBAD	data

Tau Pegasi (τ Pegasi, abbreviated Tau Peg, τ Peg), formally named Salm /ˈsɑːm/, is a magnitude 4.6 star 162 light-years away in the constellation of Pegasus. With about twice the mass of the Sun and thirty times as luminous, it is a δ Scuti variable star with its brightness changing by a few hundredths of a magnitude over about an hour.

== Nomenclature ==
τ Pegasi (Latinised to Tau Pegasi) is the star's Bayer designation.

The star bore the traditional names Salm, Kerb (or El Khereb) and Markab (often spelled Markeb), a name shared with Alpha Pegasi, k Puppis and Kappa Velorum. In 2016, the IAU organized a Working Group on Star Names (WGSN) to catalog and standardize proper names for stars. The WGSN approved the name Salm (a homophone with the planet Samh) for this star and Markeb for the component Kappa Velorum A, both on 5 September 2017. Markab had previously been approved for Alpha Pegasi on 30 June 2016. All three are now so included in the List of IAU-approved Star Names.

In Chinese, 離宮 (Lì Gōng), meaning Resting Palace, refers to an asterism consisting of Tau Pegasi, Lambda Pegasi, Mu Pegasi, Omicron Pegasi, Eta Pegasi and Nu Pegasi. Consequently, the Chinese name for Tau Pegasi itself is 離宮五 (Lì Gōng wǔ), "the Fifth Star of Resting Palace".

== Properties ==
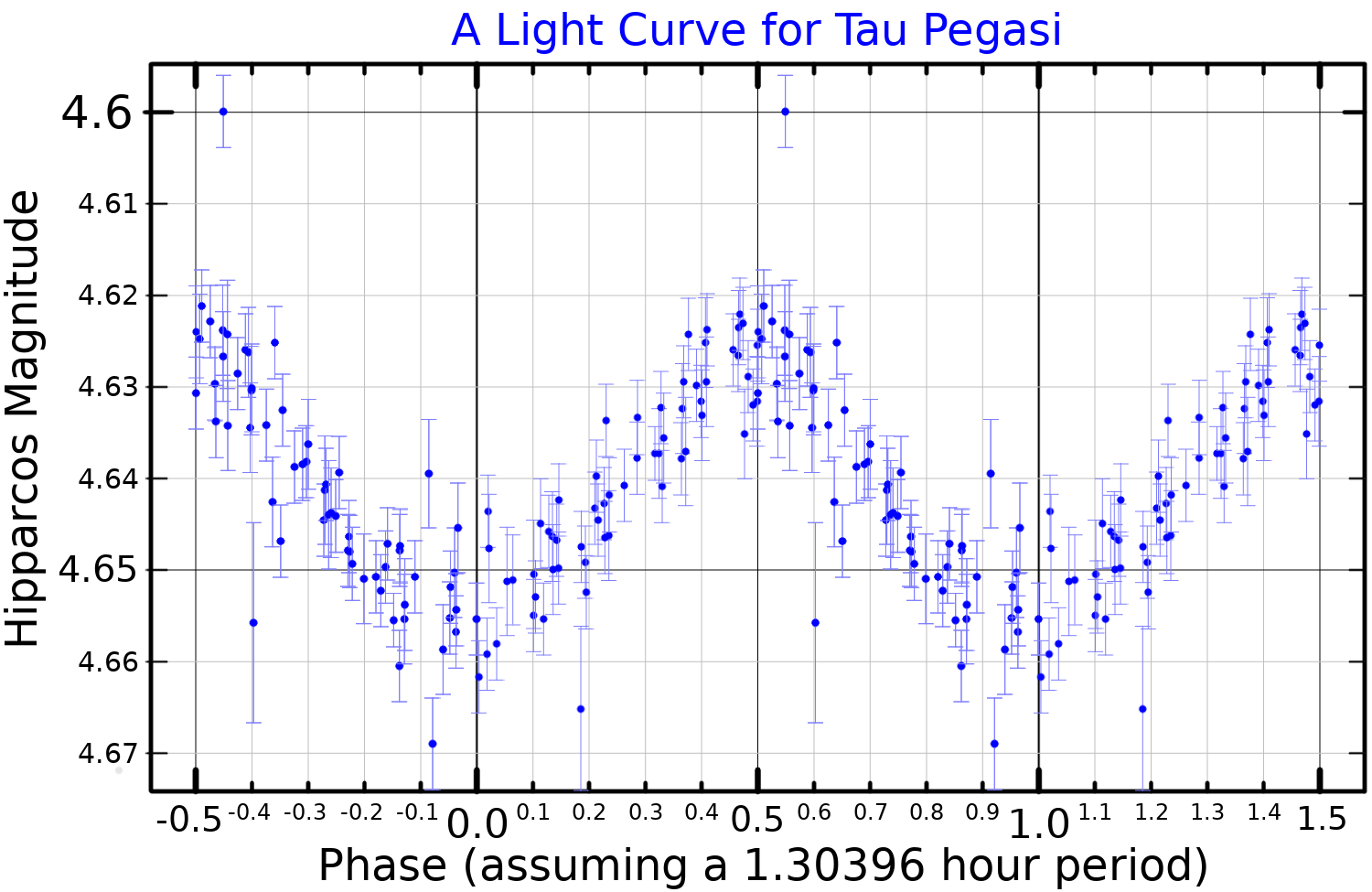
A light curve for Tau Pegasi, plotted from Hipparcos data

Tau Pegasi belongs to spectral class A5 Vp, making it an A-type main-sequence star. It is a type of chemically peculiar star with unusually weak spectral lines of iron peak elements, a class known as λ Boötis stars.

Tau Pegasi is a multiperiodic Delta Scuti variable, with reported pulsation periods ranging from 0.94 to 1.30 hours. It is rotating rapidly with a projected rotational velocity of 150 km/s. Tau Pegasi is radiating nearly 30 times the luminosity of the Sun from its outer atmosphere at an effective temperature of 7,762 K.
