= Eta Pegasi =

Binary star in the constellation Pegasus

- Location of η Pegasi (circled) near the center

Observation data Epoch J2000.0 Equinox ICRS
- Constellation: Pegasus
- Right ascension: 22^{h} 43^{m} 00.13743^{s}
- Declination: +30° 13′ 16.4822″
- Apparent magnitude (V): +2.95

Characteristics
- Spectral type: G2 II + F0 V
- U−B color index: +0.57
- B−V color index: +0.86

Astrometry
Radial velocity (R_{v})	+4.3 km/s
Proper motion (μ)	RA: +13.16 mas/yr Dec.: -25.67 mas/yr
Parallax (π)	15.22±0.71 mas
Distance	214 ± 10 ly (66 ± 3 pc)
Absolute magnitude (M_{V})	–1.18

Orbit
Period (P)	813 days
Eccentricity (e)	0.183
Periastron epoch (T)	2452025 HJD
Argument of periastron (ω) (secondary)	344.7°
Semi-amplitude (K_{1}) (primary)	14.37 km/s

Details

η Peg A
Mass	3.51±0.13 M_{☉}
Radius	24.51+1.11 −1.21 R_{☉}
Luminosity	330.8±35.0 L_{☉}
Surface gravity (log g)	2.40 cgs
Temperature	4970±65 K
Metallicity [Fe/H]	+0.39 dex
Rotation	818
Rotational velocity (v sin i)	1.4 km/s
Age	0.27±0.03 Gyr

Other designations
- Matar, Eta Peg, η Peg, 44 Peg, BD+29°4741, FK5 857, HD 215182, HIP 112158, HR 8650, SAO 90734

Database references
SIMBAD	data

Eta Pegasi or η Pegasi, formally named Matar /ˈmeɪtɑːr/, is a binary star in the constellation of Pegasus. The apparent visual magnitude of this star is +2.95, making it the fifth-brightest member of Pegasus. Based upon parallax measurements, the distance to this star is about 214 light-years (66 parsecs) from the Sun.

== Nomenclature ==
η Pegasi (Latinised to Eta Pegasi) is the star's Bayer designation.

It bore the traditional name Matar, derived from the Arabic سعد المطر Saʽd al Maṭar, meaning lucky star of rain. In 2016, the International Astronomical Union organized a Working Group on Star Names (WGSN) to catalogue and standardize proper names for stars. The WGSN approved the name Matar for η Pegasi A on 21 August 2016 and it is now so entered in the IAU Catalog of Star Names.

In Chinese, 離宮 (Lì Gōng), meaning Resting Palace, refers to an asterism consisting η Pegasi, λ Pegasi, μ Pegasi, ο Pegasi, τ Pegasi and ν Pegasi. Consequently, η Pegasi itself is known as 離宮四 (Lì Gōng sì), "the Fourth Star of Resting Palace".

=== Namesake ===
USS Matar (AK-119) was a United States Navy Crater class cargo ship named after the star.

== Properties ==
The Eta Pegasi system consists of a pair of stars in a binary orbit with a period of 813 days and an eccentricity of 0.183. The primary component is a bright giant star with a stellar classification of G2 II and about three and a half times the mass of the Sun. The interferometry-measured angular diameter of this star, after correcting for limb darkening, is 3.471 ± 0.027 mas, which, at its estimated distance, equates to a physical radius of more than 24 times the radius of the Sun. It is radiating 331 times the luminosity of the Sun from its expanded outer envelope at an effective temperature of 4,970 K. The rotation rate of the star slowed as it expanded, so it has a projected rotational velocity of 1.7 km s^{−1} with an estimated rotation period of 818 days.

The secondary component is an F-type main sequence star with a classification of F0 V. The secondary star is 3.56 magnitudes fainter that the primary star at 700 nm. There are also 2 class G stars further away that may or may not be physically related to the main pair.
