= Mu Pegasi =

Star in the constellation Pegasus

- Location of μ Pegasi (circled)

Observation data Epoch J2000 Equinox ICRS
- Constellation: Pegasus
- Right ascension: 22^{h} 50^{m} 00.19307^{s}
- Declination: +24° 36′ 05.6926″
- Apparent magnitude (V): 3.514

Characteristics
- Evolutionary stage: Yellow giant
- Spectral type: G8 III
- U−B color index: +0.674
- B−V color index: +0.932

Astrometry
Radial velocity (R_{v})	+13.54 ± 0.20 km/s
Proper motion (μ)	RA: +145.240 mas/yr Dec.: −42.396 mas/yr
Parallax (π)	28.934±0.189 mas
Distance	112.7 ± 0.7 ly (34.6 ± 0.2 pc)
Absolute magnitude (M_{V})	+0.432

Details
Mass	2.59±0.05 M_{☉}
Radius	9.32±0.47 R_{☉}
Luminosity	46.9±0.6 L_{☉}
Surface gravity (log g)	2.85±0.03 cgs
Temperature	4,961±40 K
Metallicity [Fe/H]	−0.03±0.02 dex
Rotational velocity (v sin i)	0.95±0.45 km/s
Age	520±30 Myr

Other designations
- Sadalbari, Mu Peg, μ Peg, 48 Peg, BD+23 4615, FK5 862, GJ 4298, HD 216131, HIP 112748, HR 8684, SAO 90816

Database references
SIMBAD	data

Mu Pegasi or μ Pegasi, formally named Sadalbari (/ˌsædəlˈbɛəri/), is a star in the northern constellation of Pegasus. The apparent visual magnitude of this star is 3.5, which is bright enough to be seen with the naked eye even on a moonlit night. Based upon parallax measurements taken by the Gaia spacecraft, it is approximately 113 light-years (35 parsecs) from the Sun.

== Nomenclature ==
μ Pegasi (Latinised to Mu Pegasi) is the star's Bayer designation.

It bore the traditional name Sadalbari, which derives from Arabic: سعد بارع saʿd al-bāriʿ, the “auspicious star of the splendid one.” In 2016, the International Astronomical Union organized a Working Group on Star Names (WGSN) to catalogue and standardize proper names for stars. The WGSN approved the name Sadalbari for this star on 21 August 2016 and it is now so included in the List of IAU-approved Star Names.

In Chinese, 離宮 (Lì Gōng), meaning Resting Palace, refers to an asterism consisting of Mu Pegasi, Lambda Pegasi, Omicron Pegasi, Eta Pegasi, Tau Pegasi and Nu Pegasi. Consequently, the Chinese name for Mu Pegasi itself is 離宮二 (Lì Gōng èr, "the Second Star of Resting Palace").

== Properties ==
The spectrum of this star matches a stellar classification of G8 III. The luminosity class of 'III' means that it has exhausted the hydrogen fuel at its core and evolved into a giant star. It is 520 million years old and 2.6 times more massive than the Sun, but has expanded to nine times the Sun's radius. The effective temperature of the outer atmosphere is about 4,961 K, which is cooler than the Sun and gives it the yellow hue of a G-type star. The abundance of elements other than hydrogen and helium, what astronomers term the metallicity, is a bit smaller than the abundance in the Sun.
