= Matara =

Matara may refer to:

== Places ==
=== Peru ===
- Matara District, Cajamarca, Cajamarca Province, Peru
- Matará, Cangallo Province, Peru

=== Sri Lanka ===
- Matara, Sri Lanka, a city on the coast of Southern Province
- Matara District, Southern Province, Sri Lanka
- Matara fort, built in 1560 by the Portuguese on a promontory which separates the Niwala Ganga lagoon from the ocean
- Matara railway station, Sri Lanka

=== Other places ===
- Matara, Eritrea, an archaeological site near Senafe

== Other uses ==
- Matara (Martian crater)
- Matara Bodhiya, a sacred fig tree in Matara, Sri Lanka
- Matara SC, a Sri Lankan football club
- Matara Sports Club, a first-class cricket team in Sri Lanka

== See also ==
- Matra (disambiguation)
- Matar (disambiguation)
