= Iota Pegasi =

Star in the constellation Pegasus

- Location of ι Pegasi (circled)

Observation data Epoch J2000.0 Equinox ICRS
- Constellation: Pegasus
- Right ascension: 22^{h} 07^{m} 00.66206^{s}
- Declination: +25° 20′ 42.3761″
- Apparent magnitude (V): 3.77 (3.84 + 6.68)

Characteristics
- Spectral type: F5V + G8V

Astrometry
Radial velocity (R_{v})	−5.5±0.7 km/s
Proper motion (μ)	RA: 298.420 mas/yr Dec.: 26.161 mas/yr
Parallax (π)	84.7637±0.3596 mas
Distance	38.5 ± 0.2 ly (11.80 ± 0.05 pc)
Absolute magnitude (M_{V})	3.42 (3.49 + 6.33)

Orbit
Name	Iota Pegasi Ab
Period (P)	10.2130253(16) d
Semi-major axis (a)	10.329(16) mas
Eccentricity (e)	0.001764(63)
Inclination (i)	95.83(12)°
Longitude of the node (Ω)	176.262(75)°
Periastron epoch (T)	52997.378(52)
Argument of periastron (ω) (secondary)	272.8(1.8)°
Semi-amplitude (K_{1}) (primary)	48.4757(39) km/s
Semi-amplitude (K_{2}) (secondary)	77.777(16) km/s

Details

ι Peg Aa
Mass	1.33249±0.00086 M_{☉}
Radius	1.526±0.068 R_{☉}
Surface gravity (log g)	4.26 cgs
Temperature	6,580 K
Age	4−663 Myr

ι Peg Ab
Mass	0.83050±0.00055 M_{☉}
Radius	0.73 R_{☉}
Surface gravity (log g)	4.62 cgs
Temperature	5,060 K

Other designations
- Jiu, ι Peg, 24 Pegasi, BD+24°4533, FK5 831, GJ 848, HD 210027, HIP 109176, HR 8430, SAO 90238, WDS J22070+2521A

Database references
SIMBAD	data

Iota Pegasi, also named Jiu, is a double-lined spectroscopic binary star system located within the northern constellation of Pegasus, along a line between Lambda and Kappa Pegasi. It is visible to the naked eye as a yellow-hued point of light with a combined apparent visual magnitude of 3.77. The system is located 38.5 light years from the Sun based on parallax, but is drifting closer with a radial velocity of −5.5 km/s.

== Nomenclature ==
ι Pegasi, Latinized as Iota Pegasi, is the star's Bayer designation. In Chinese astronomy, this star is part of the constellation Jiù (Mortar, 臼). The IAU Working Group on Star Names adopted the name Jiu for this star on 13 August 2026, after this Chinese constellation.

== Properties ==
The binary nature of this system was discovered by W. W. Campbell in 1899 and the initial orbital elements were estimated by H. D. Curtis in 1904. The primary, designated component Aa, is a yellowish-white star somewhat brighter than the sun. It and the dimmer component Ab orbit each other with a period of about 10 days and a small, but non-zero eccentricity. They appear to be very young stars, close to zero-age main sequence.

In about four billion years from now, component Aa will evolve off the main sequence into a giant. In the process it will overflow its Roche lobe and begin to transfer mass onto the secondary. This may cause the secondary to acquire enough mass to become the primary component. After both stars have passed through the giant star stage, the end result will be a pair of co-orbiting white dwarfs in about eight billion years.
