= Mattar =

Mattar is an Arabic surname. People with that name include:

- Ahmad Mattar, Singaporean politician
- Mattar (Brazilian footballer), Antônio Mattar Neto, Brazilian football player
- Ali Mattar (born 1963), Bahraini politician
- Haitham Mattar, Lebanese-American business executive
- Hassan Mattar, (born 1956), Qatari football player
- Luiz Mattar, Brazilian tennis player
- Malak Mattar, Palestinian artist
- Maurício Mattar, (born 1964), Brazilian actor
- Philip Mattar, (born 1944), Palestinian-American historian
- Spiridon Mattar (1921–2014), Melkite Greek Catholic Church leader

== See also ==
- Matar (disambiguation)
- Mattar MRT station
