= Yamaguchi University =

National university in Yamaguchi Prefecture, Japan

- 山口大学
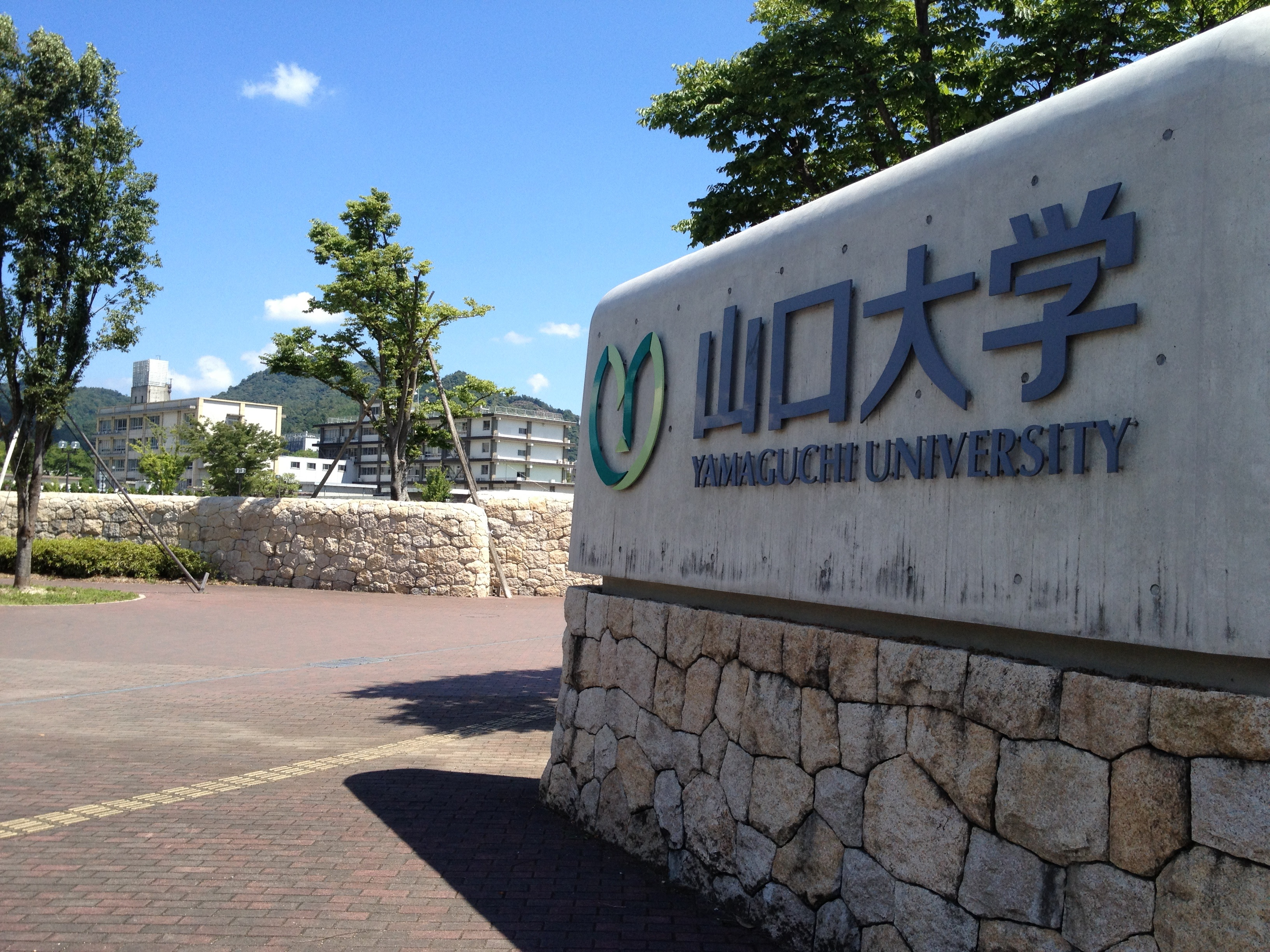
- Motto: Discover it. Nourish it. Realise it. A Place of Wisdom. (発見し・はぐくみ・かたちにする 知の広場)
- Type: National
- Established: Founded 1894; Chartered 1949
- President: TANIZAWA Yukio
- Academic staff: 2,640 full-time (May 2017)
- Students: 10,213 (May 2017)
- Undergraduates: 8,702
- Postgraduates: 1,043
- Doctoral students: 468
- Location: Yamaguchi, Yamaguchi, Japan
- Campus: Suburb
- Website: www.yamaguchi-u.ac.jp

Yamaguchi University (山口大学, Yamaguchi daigaku) is a national university in Yamaguchi Prefecture, Japan. It has campuses at the cities of Yamaguchi and Ube.

== History ==
The root of the university was Yamaguchi Auditorium (山口講堂, Yamaguchi kōdō), a private school founded by Ueda Hōyō (上田鳳陽, 1769–1853) in 1815. In 1863 the school became a han school of Chōshū Domain and was renamed Yamaguchi Meirinkan.

After the Meiji Restoration it became a prefectural secondary school, and in 1894 it developed into (older) Yamaguchi Higher School (山口高等学校, Yamaguchi kōtō gakkō), a national institute of higher education. It served as a preparatory course for the Imperial University. In February 1905 the school was reorganized into Yamaguchi Higher School of Commerce (山口高等商業学校, Yamaguchi kōtō shōgyō gakkō), the third national commercial college in Japan, after Tokyo (1887) and Kobe (1902). In 1944 the school was renamed Yamaguchi College of Economics.

In 1949 Yamaguchi University was established by integrating six public (national and prefectural) schools in Yamaguchi Prefecture, namely, (Revived) Yamaguchi Higher School, Yamaguchi College of Economics, Ube Technical College, Yamaguchi Normal School, Yamaguchi Youth Normal School and (Prefectural) Yamaguchi College of Veterinary Medicine and Animal Husbandry.

In 1964 Yamaguchi Prefectural Medical College was merged into the university to constitute the School of Medicine. In 1966 Yoshida Campus (the main campus) was opened, and the faculties (except Engineering and Medicine) moved to the campus in the following years.

== Undergraduate schools ==
Yoshida Campus (in Yamaguchi)

- Faculty of Humanities
- Faculty of Education
- Faculty of Economics
- Faculty of Science
- Faculty of Agriculture

Kogushi Campus (in Ube)

- School of Medicine

Tokiwa Campus (in Ube)

- Faculty of Engineering

== Graduate schools ==
- Graduate School of Humanities (Master's courses only)
- Graduate School of Education (Master's courses only)
- Graduate School of Economics (Master's courses only)
- Graduate School of Medicine
- Graduate School of Science and Engineering
- Graduate School of Agriculture (Master's courses only)
- Graduate School of East Asian Studies (Doctoral courses only)
- Graduate School of Innovation and Technology Management (professional courses)
- United Graduate School of Veterinary Science, Yamaguchi University (Doctoral courses only)
- United Graduate School of Agricultural Science, Tottori University (Doctoral courses only)

== Alumni ==
- Maryam Matar (born 1975), Emirati geneticist and medical researcher
- Daishiro Yamagiwa (born 1968), Japanese politician
- Rismon Hasiholan Sianipar (born 1977), an Indonesian academic, researcher, and software developer
