= Iraqi nationalism =

Nationalism in Iraq

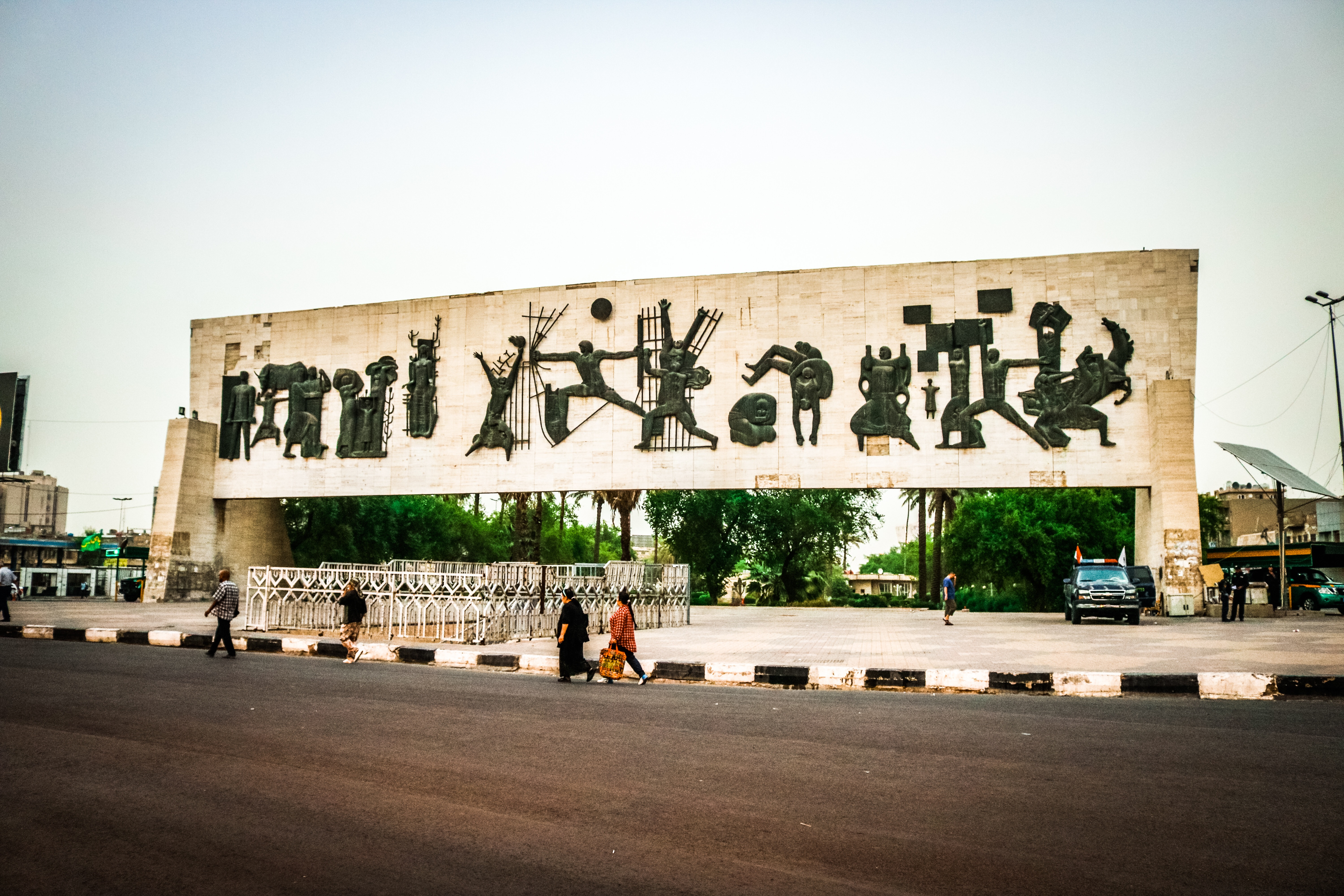
The Freedom Monument in Baghdad that commemorates Iraq's declaration of independence and has bas-relief figures referencing the style of ancient Mesopotamian art.

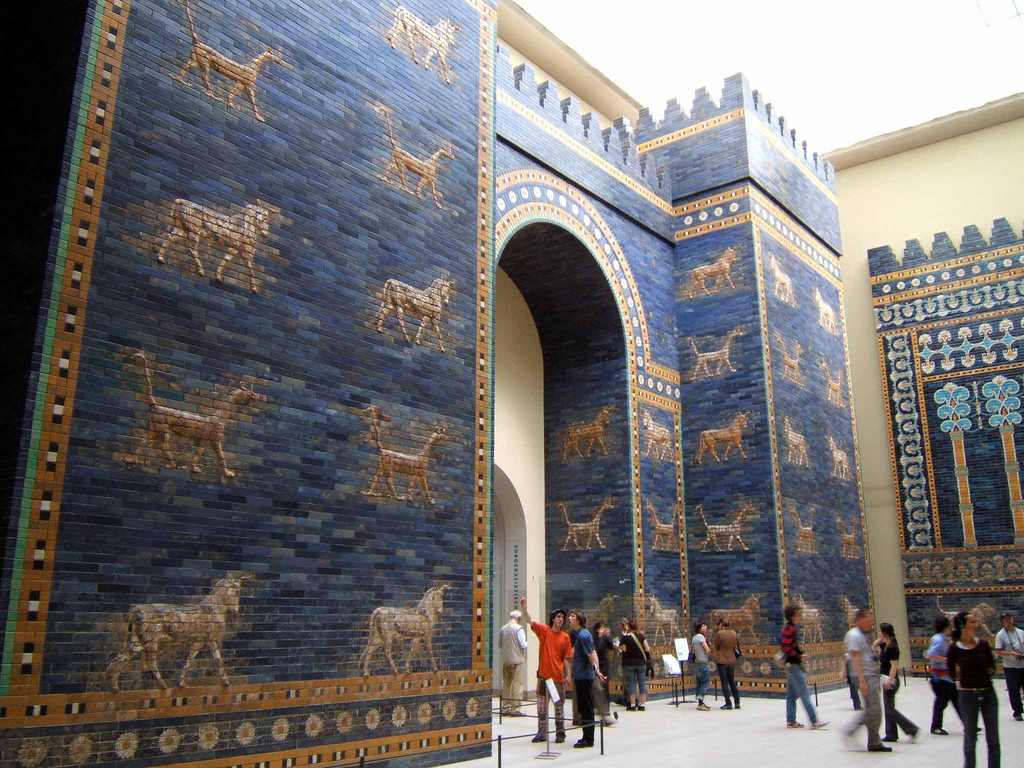
The Ishtar Gate, the eighth gate to the inner city of Babylon, is a well recognized symbol of Iraq's unique national heritage.

Iraqi nationalism is a form of nationalism that involves the recognition of an Iraqi identity stemming from ancient Mesopotamia including its civilizations and empires of Sumer, Akkad, Babylon and Assyria and influenced Iraq's movement for independence from Ottoman and from British occupation and was an important factor in the 1920 Revolution against the British and the 1958 Revolution against the British-installed Hashemite monarchy.

== Iraqi nationalist identity and culture ==
=== Cultural history ===
Iraqi nationalism has emphasized Iraq's cultural heritage which dates back to ancient Sumer, Akkad, Babylonia and Assyria, states that are considered the cradle of civilization that spread civilization to other parts of the world. The Babylonian ruler Nebuchadnezzar II and Kurdish Muslim leader Saladin are two important historical figures of Iraq and iconic figures in Iraqi nationalism.

The concept of contemporary Iraqi national identity may have originated with the rebellion and subsequent British siege of Najaf in 1918 during World War I, but this is disputed. By the 1930s advocacy of the concept of an Iraqi territorial identity arose amongst the Iraqi intellectual field and Iraqi identity grew in importance after World War II. Though Iraqi nationalism and Arab nationalism are technically separate from each other, both nationalisms influenced each other - adopting each other's metaphors and narratives. In some cases Iraqi nationalism has been advocated as a necessary supplement to Arab nationalism such as the Iraqi political newspaper Al-Hatif advocating Iraqi nationalism on issues of domestic Iraqi culture, and advocating Arab nationalism on issues of broader Arab culture.

During the Hashemite monarchy period in Iraq, it was commonplace for writers to write of an Iraqi identity separate from an Arab framework, Iraq's print media and education at the time emphasized Iraq's landscape, its tribes, and its unique poetry and literature. Beginning in the 1930s, Iraqi historians began to address the Iraq revolt of 1920 by Iraqis against the British as a formative moment in Iraqi history that Iraqi historians referred to as "the Great Iraqi Revolution".

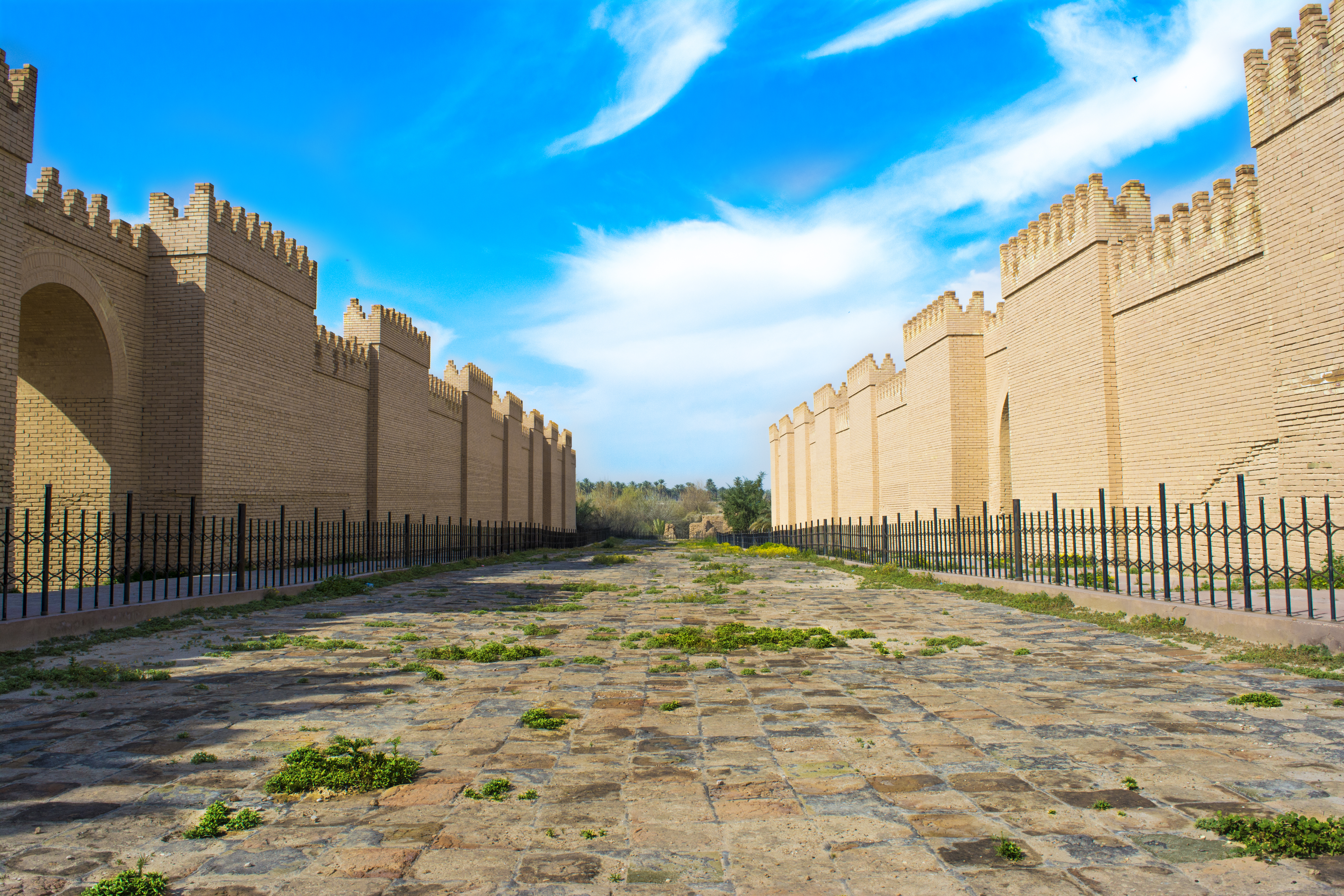
Reconstructed full-scale replica of the ancient city of Babylon in Iraq.

Prominent early Iraqi nationalist figures were the intellectuals 'Abd al-Razzaq al-Hasani and 'Abbas 'Azzawi. Al-Hasani was strongly critical of the British Mandate for Mesopotamia, published his first volume of his work The History of Iraqi Governments in the 1930s (the second published in the 1950s), the first volume was endorsed by King Faisal I of Iraq. Al-Hasani was a prominent proponent of Iraqi nationalism. In one of his works al-Hasani included a letter by Faisal I, the letter had Faisal I describing Iraq as suffering from religious and sectarian tensions due to Iraqis being unable to form a common nationalism. Faisal I described Iraq as being governed by a literate Sunni elite over illiterate and ignorant Shi'ite and Kurdish sects who opposed the central government. 'Azzawi wrote Iraq between Two Occupations - referring to the Turkish and British rule, that received acclaim by the Iraqi government that assisted him in publishing his work. The works of both al-Hasani and 'Azzawi were highly popular from 1935 to 1965, with many of their works being published in second and third editions and both authors' works influenced Iraqi nationalism.

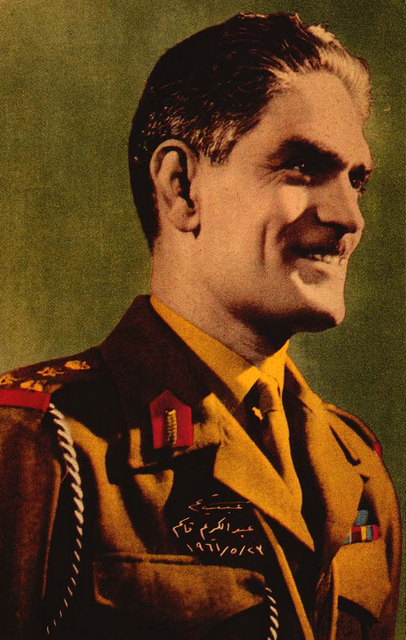
Abd al-Karim Qasim, a nationalist who promoted the view that different ethnoreligious groups of Iraq have a common Mesopotamian heritage.

Under Qassim, Iraqi cultural identity based on Arabo-Kurdish fraternity was stressed over ethnic identity, Qassim's government sought to merge Kurdish nationalism into Iraqi nationalism and Iraqi culture, stating: "Iraq is not only an Arab state but an Arabo-Kurdish state...[T]he recognition of Kurdish nationalism by Arabs proves clearly that we are associated in the country, that we are Iraqis first, Arabs and Kurds later". The Qassim government's pro-Kurdish policies including a statement promising "Kurdish national rights within Iraqi unity" and open attempts by Iraq to coopt Iranian Kurds to support unifying with Iraq resulted in Iran responding by declaring Iran's support for the unification of all Kurds who were residing in Iraq and Syria, into Iran. Qassim's initial policies towards Kurds were very popular amongst Kurds across the Middle East whom in support of his policies called Qassim "the leader of the Arabs and the Kurds".

Kurdish leader Mustafa Barzani during his alliance with Qassim and upon Qassim granting him the right to return to Iraq from exile imposed by the former monarchy, declared support of the Kurdish people for being citizens of Iraq, saying in 1958 "On behalf of all my Kurdish brothers who have long struggled, once again I congratulate you [Qassim] and the Iraqi people, Kurds and Arabs, for the glorious Revolution putting an end to imperialism and the reactionary and corrupt monarchist gang". Barzani also commended Qassim for allowing Kurdish refugee diaspora to return to Iraq and declared his loyalty to Iraq, saying "Your Excellency, leader of the people: I take this opportunity to tender my sincere appreciation and that of my fellow Kurdish refugees in the Socialist countries for allowing us to return to our beloved homeland, and to join in the honor of defending the great cause of our people, the cause of defending the republic and its homeland."

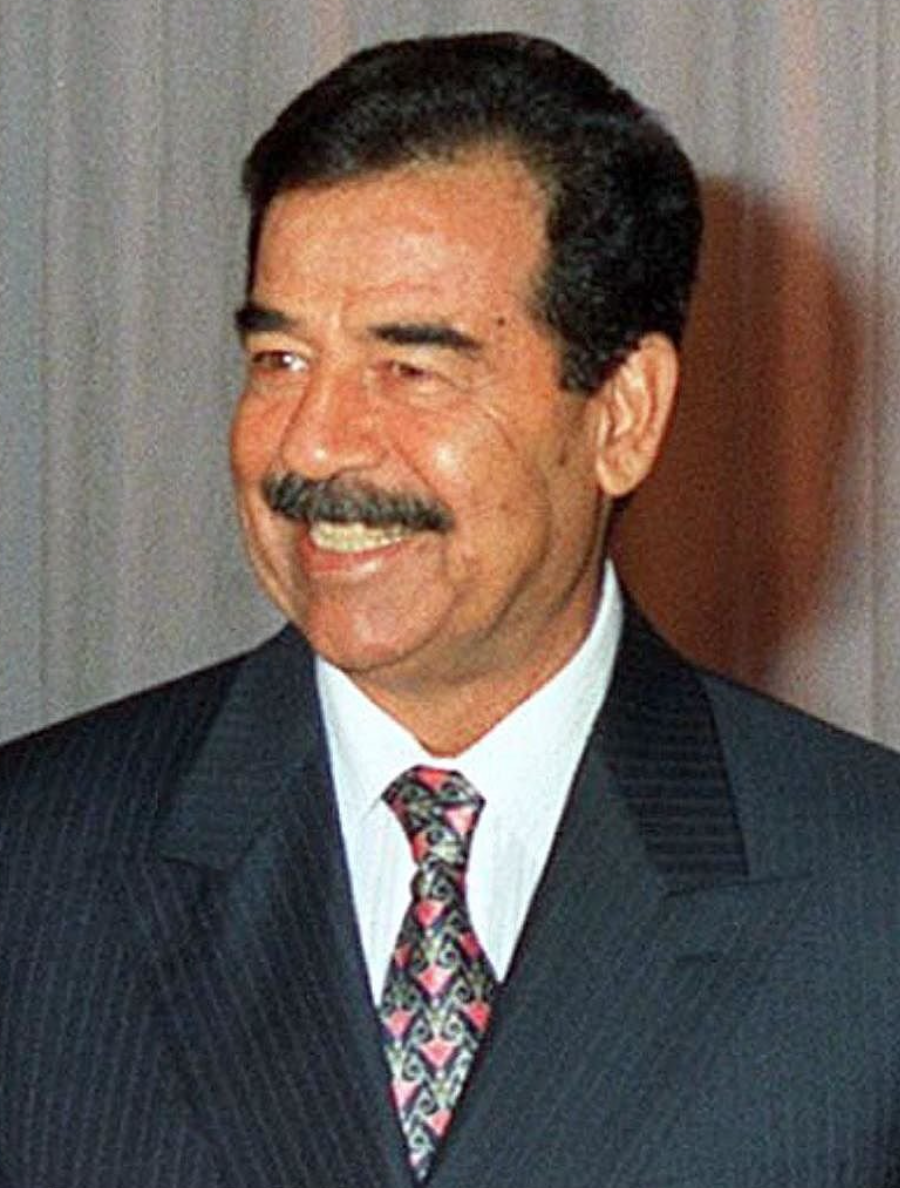
Saddam Hussein, President of Iraq from 1979-2003, Vice President of Iraq from 1968-1979.

Saddam Hussein and Iraqi Ba'athist ideologists sought to fuse a connection between ancient Babylonian and Assyrian civilization in Iraq to the Arab nationalism by claiming that the Babylonians and ancient Assyrians are the ancestors of the Arabs. Thus, Saddam Hussein and his supporters claim that there is no conflict between Mesopotamian heritage and Arab nationalism.

Saddam Hussein as President of Iraq expressed himself as an Iraqi in state art - associating himself as a modern-day Nebuchadnezzar II and wearing both Arabic and Kurdish headgear in such art. Saddam Hussein also paralleled himself and the Ba'athist government to Saladin, the famous Kurdish leader of Muslim forces against Crusaders in Jerusalem, who was from modern day Iraq.

== Symbols ==
The flag of Iraq from 1924–1959. It uses the colours of the Hashimite royal family (that also became a symbol of pan-Arabism).

The flag of Iraq from 1959–1963, it espouses a unified Iraqi identity bearing pan-Arab colours (black, green, red, white), Kurdish colours (green, red, white, yellow), the ancient Assyro-Babylonian Star of Ishtar symbol in red behind the Kurdish yellow sun.

Flag of Iraq from 1963-1991.

The flag of Iraq from 1991–2004, same as the previous flag but with the Takbir between the stars.

Emblem of Iraq (1959-1965), uses a combination of Star of Ishtar and Shamash to represent ancient Mesopotamian heritage.
Shamash sun symbol, standard from the Akkadian period down to the Neo-Babylonian period. This iconography later gave rise to the emblem of Iraq (1959-1965)

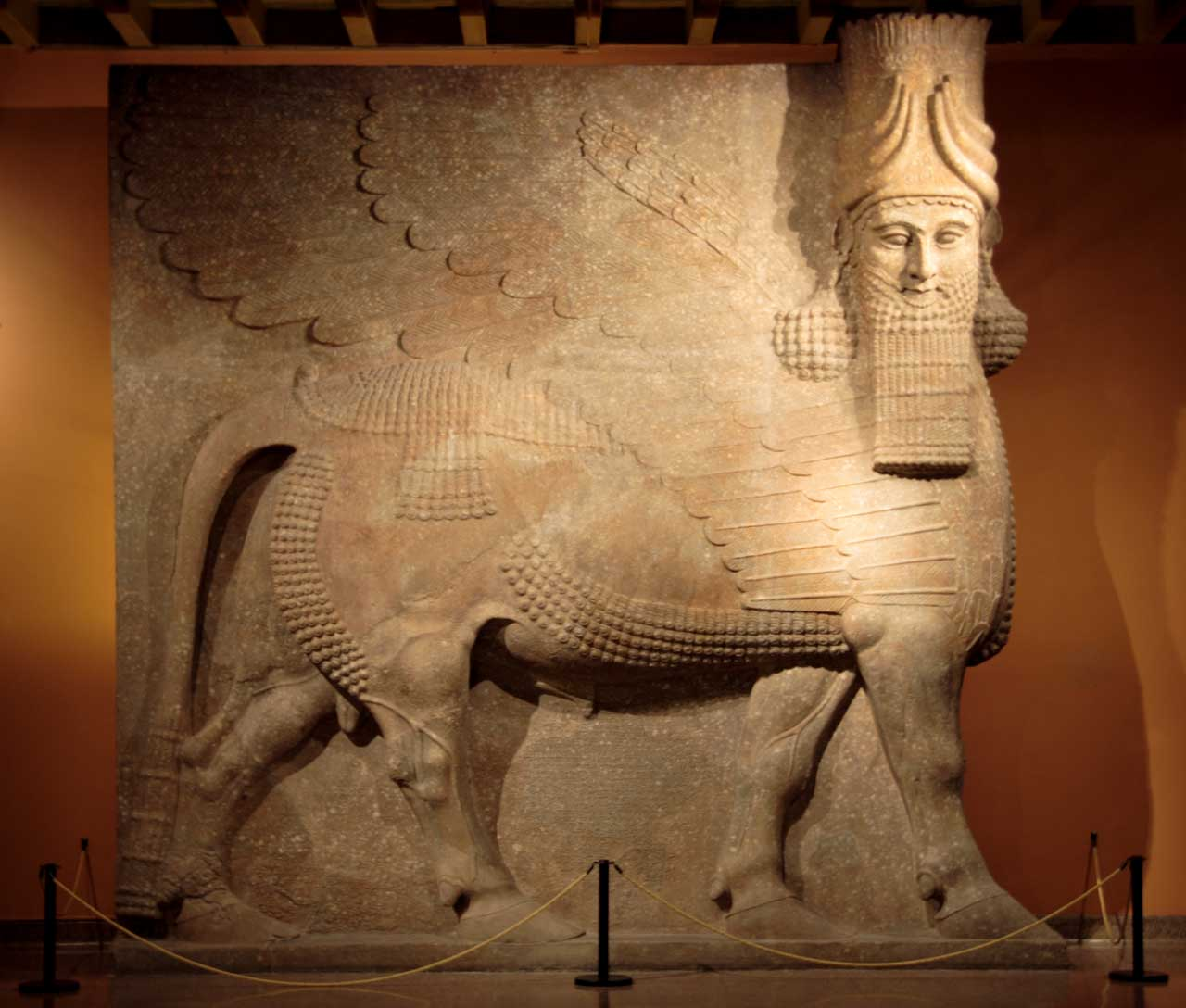
Initially depicted as a goddess in Sumerian times, when it was called Lamma, it was later depicted from Assyrian times as hybrid of a human, bird, and either a bull or lion under the name Lamassu. It appears frequently in Mesopotamian art and Iraqi art.

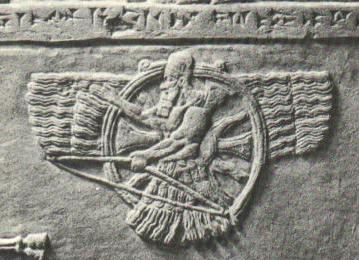
A Neo-Assyrian relief of Ashur as a feather robed archer. It appears frequently in Mesopotamian art and Iraqi art.

The Star of Ishtar is a symbol of the ancient Sumerian goddess Inanna. This symbol, alongside Shamash, later gave rise to the emblem of Iraq (1959-1965).

== Iraqi nationalism today ==
After the 2003 invasion of Iraq, the country fell into a state of chaos. A weak central government along with the rise of sectarian civil war among the Iraqi people diminished the value of Iraqi nationalism. Many who call for a revival of Iraqi nationalism for the glory of the Iraqi people are stigmatized and stereotyped as Ba'athists. As living conditions deteriorated in many parts of the country and constant fighting raged on, many people thought less of their Iraqi heritage.

In recent years, analysts have observed a surge in Iraqi nationalism and patriotism as most Iraqis blamed sectarianism for the bloodshed and violence in the country.

One of the biggest factors that led to the 2019–2021 Iraqi protests was the rise of Iraqi nationalism among the youth.

=== Nationalism and foreign intervention ===
The US invasion exerted influence on Iraq’s approach to intervention. Iraq is conceptualized as a politically-contested region following the de-Baathification process, which encompassed the transformation of the government. Ethnic groups held divergent conceptions regarding what it meant to be an Iraqi. Saddam Hussein, preceding 2003, established a dictatorship led by Sunnis after gaining power in 1979, which encompassed ethnic and sectarian tensions along with political inefficiency. Sectarian identification resulted in clashes between ethnic groups, contributing to their contrasting perceptions of foreigners. The intervention, both by the US and Iran, can be conceptualized differently from a nationalist perspective. On the one hand, nationalism promotes opposition against intervention because occupation connotes violating sovereignty, diminishing the state’s right to self-determination. The trespassing of another state’s legally-established boundaries confronts the notion of territorial sovereignty, therefore, nationalists fuel resistance against intervention. On the other hand, nationalists, to defend their nation, embrace external support to reach their objectives. National identity surpasses other types of identification, therefore, nationalists often support intervention as an instrument to eliminate the threats posed, in Iraq’s case, by the ISIL. The country’s majority ethnic groups, the Shia Arabs, the Sunni Arabs, and the Kurds interpret intervention through their comprehension of nationalism. While the Shia Arabs approve of Iranian interference because of their shared sectarian identity, the Sunni Arabs recognize Iran as an adversary, advocating for a powerful role of the US. The Kurds, an ethnic community that acquired American protection against oppression, encourage US interference. Regardless of their diverse sub-national attitudes, Iraqi national identity influenced them to support intervention because assistance in the armed struggle against ISIL is inevitable.

=== Nationalism and Shia-Kurdish relations post-2003 ===
The collapse of the Baathist system and the regime change equipped the Shias and Kurds to construct a power-sharing structure. Mutual recognition between the groups was conceivable because neither of them embraced an essentialist sense of identity that would have prevented them from cooperation. Postmodernism, which is appreciated by the two communities, dismantles the fixed notions of identity by perceiving personhood as fluid, fragmented, and in continuous change. The conceptualization of identity through this lens enabled them to engage in cooperation, although power struggles prevailed. The constitution depicts Iraqis as “ people of Mesopotamia”, which signifies their association with Islam and Islamic democracy, as encouraged by the Shiis. A break with the secular dictatorship of Saddam Hussein is apparent by emphasizing the Islamic foundation of the national identity by anchoring it in Iraq’s heritage.

=== Post-2003 revolutions ===
In 2011 uprisings erupted all over the Middle East. The Iraqi population joined the Arab Spring in February 2011. Hundreds of people were protesting in Baghdad but also all over the city. People were protesting because the state was failing to provide them with basic needs and rights. The protestors demonstrated against corruption and nepotism. They fought for a better educational system and easier access to jobs. Many tensions came also from the fact that Prime Minister Nuri al-Maliki did not respect his promises in establishing security in the country. Protests ended in violence since the government did not provide the population with what they were fighting for.

In 2012, another uprising erupted. The main actor of this uprising is the Sunni community since the government was targeting Sunni politicians, as an example the Minister of Finance, a Sunni, was arrested. The scope of protesters was broad, the youth participants got support from tribal and religious leaders. Once again, the regime repressed the protests in violence. Some of the dissatisfied protesters decided to join ISIS and continue fighting against the regime. Overall, the protestants were fighting against sectarianism. This sectarian regime is the root of most of the corruption in the country. They wanted to overthrow the Muhasassa regime imposed by the US in 2003. This regime is based on the division of power between all the different religious communities. This regime is the source of corrupted networks embedded in all religious communities.

The Shia clerics also claimed that Iraq needs to overcome this sectarian regime. The Iraqi Grand Ayatollah Ali Sistani stressed in his sermons that sectarianism is an artificial construction created as a result of the US occupation.

The uprising of 2018 was more violent than the two first. The protests were organized on social media even though it did not become a proper organization. The demands of the protestors were socioeconomic and politico-economic.

In 2019, youthful demonstrators were protesting against corruption, sectarianism, and the absence of basic rights. Beyond demands for social reforms the protest has moved to a complete rejection of the ruling classes and the system imposed by the US in 2003. The protest was very violent and lethal. As a reaction more people from diverse backgrounds joined the demonstrations. With this last uprising the state lost all legitimacy.

== See also ==
- Iraqi territorial claims
- Ghazi of Iraq
- Abd al-Karim Qasim
- Qasimism
- Muhammad Mahdi al-Jawahiri
- Selim Matar
- Safaa Al Sarai
- 2019–2021 Iraqi protests

== Sources ==
- Hanish, Shak (2008). "The Chaldean Assyrian Syriac people of Iraq: an ethnic identity problem". Digest of Middle East Studies. 17 (1): 32–47. doi:10.1111/j.1949-3606.2008.tb00145.x.
