= Iraqi territorial claims =

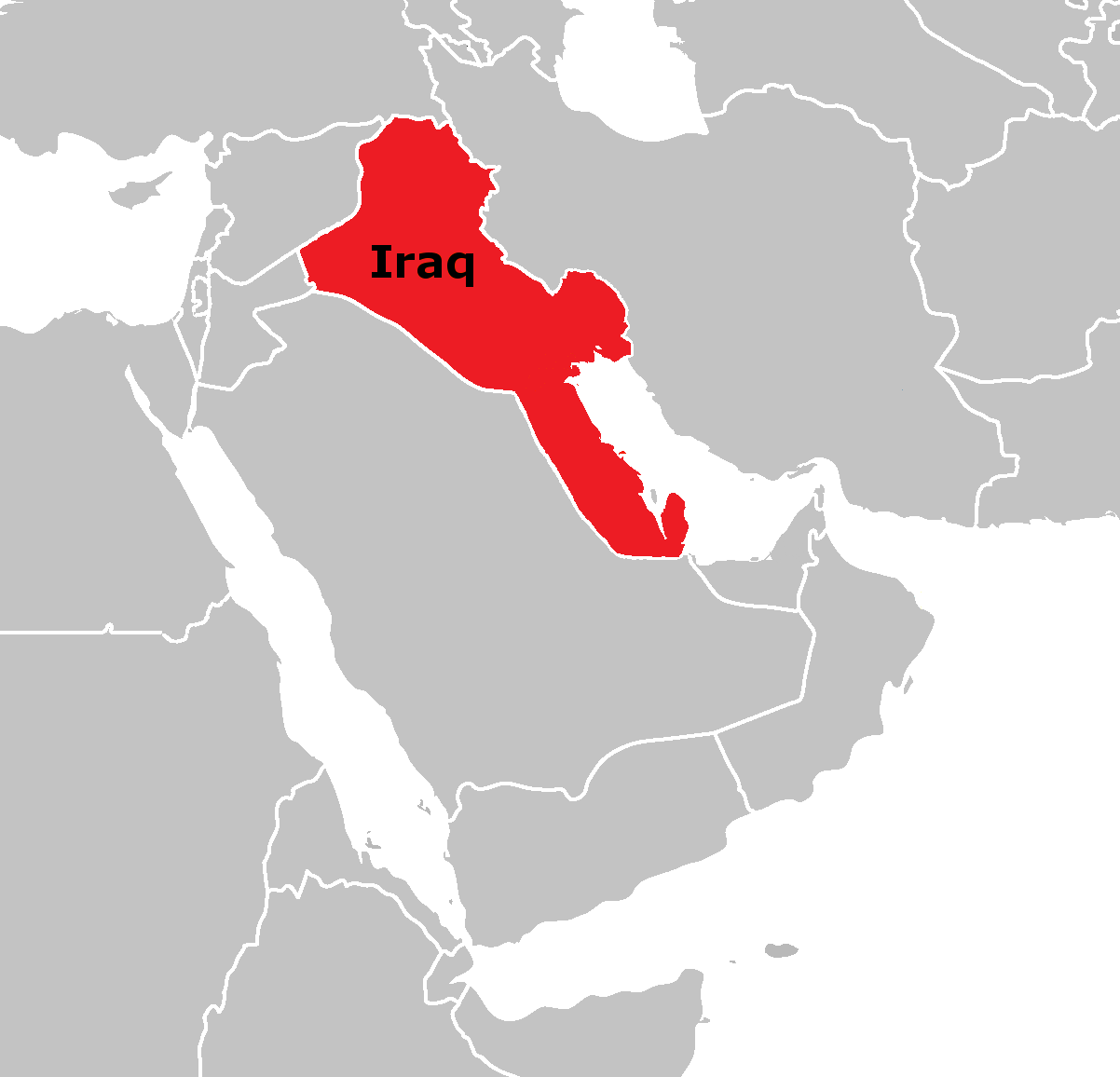
A map illustrating the modern countries and provinces historically encompassed by Iraqi irredentist rhetoric.

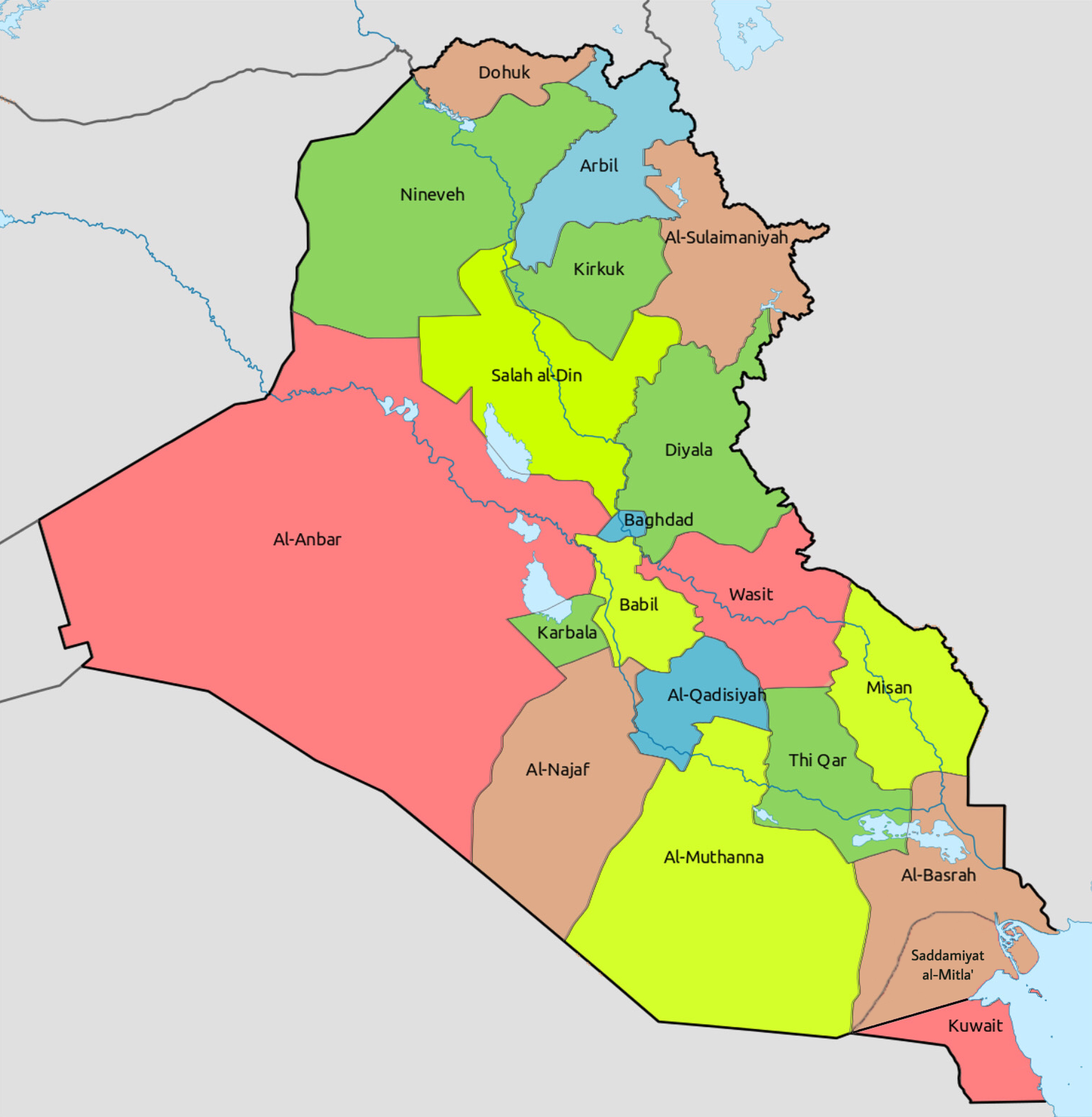
Map of the governorates of Iraq during Iraq's occupation of Kuwait from 1990 to 1991.

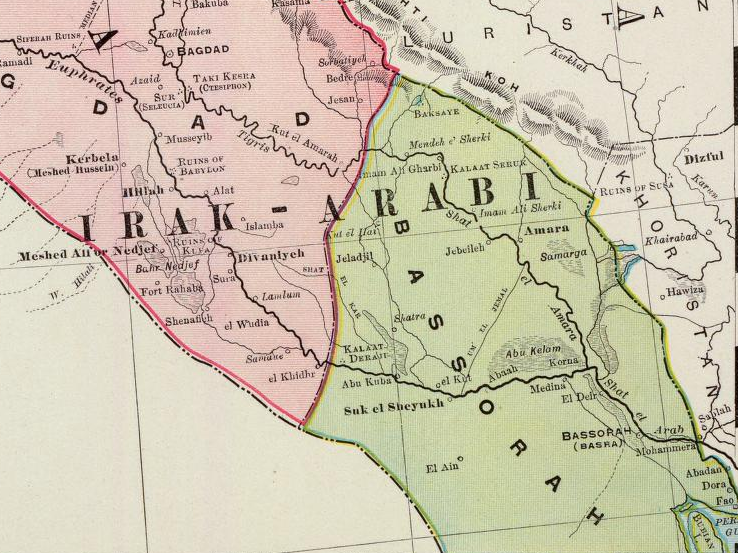
The Basra Vilayet of the Ottoman Empire shown in green on a map from 1897 with the region Arab Iraq identified on the map. After the Anglo-Ottoman Convention of 1913, Kuwait was established as an autonomous kaza, or district, of the Ottoman Empire and a de facto protectorate of the United Kingdom.

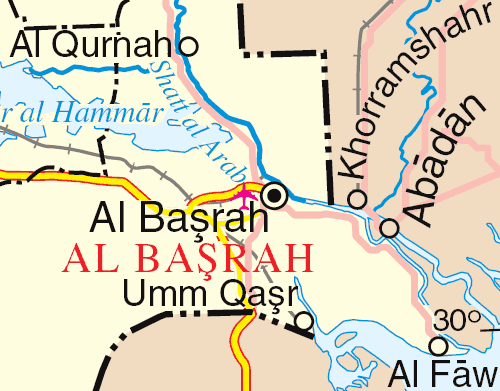
Map of southeastern Iraq showing the Shatt al-Arab, a river bordering Iraq and Iran.

There have been several Iraqi territorial claims historically made by Iraq, including over Kuwait and the east bank of the Shatt al-Arab.

== Territorial claims ==
Kuwait is a territory that historic Iraqi governments have claimed should be within Iraq. After gaining independence in 1932, the Iraqi government immediately declared that Kuwait was rightfully a territory of Iraq, claiming it had been part of an Iraqi territory until being created by the British. This stance was met with support among Kuwaitis in the 1930s and the Free Kuwaiti Movement emerged in 1938 which called for the unification of Kuwait into Iraq. In March 1939, an armed rebellion broke out in Kuwait by supporters of the movement, seeking to unify Kuwait with Iraq by force.

The Qassim government held an irredentist claim to Kuwait. In the Gulf War, Iraq occupied and annexed Kuwait before being expelled by an international military coalition that supported the restoration of Kuwait's sovereignty.

Saddam Hussein's government during the Iran-Iraq War claimed that Iraq had the right to hold sovereignty to the east bank of the Shatt al-Arab river held by Iran. Iraq had officially agreed to a compromise to hold the border at the centre-line of the river in the 1975 Algiers Agreement in return for Iran to end its support for Kurdish rebels in Iraq. The overthrow of the Iranian monarchy and the rise of Imam Ruhollah Khomeini to power in 1979 deteriorated Iran-Iraq relations and following ethnic clashes within Khuzestan and border clashes between Iranian and Iraqi forces, Iraq regarded the Algiers Agreement as nullified and abrogated it and a few days later Iraqi forces launched a full-scale invasion of Iran that resulted in the Iran-Iraq War.

The issue of Iraq seeking to acquire Khuzestan from Iran has been a historical issue in Iran-Iraq relations. The Qassim's government held a territorial claim on Khuzestan. Saddam Hussein's government supported the Iraq-based Khuzestani Arab separatists and their goal of breaking their claimed territory of Khuzestan away from Iran, in the belief that the movement would rouse Khuzestani Arabs to support the Iraqi invasion. However Iraq's ultimate objectives about what it intended to achieve regarding Khuzestan is not clear, it is suspected that Iraq during the Iran-Iraq War sought to either annex or to establish suzerainty over Khuzestan, but Saddam Hussein publicly denied this in November 1980. However in 1969 while discussing the issue of the Shatt al-Arab Saddam Hussein mentioned Khuzestan as historically being part of Iraq, saying "Iraq's dispute with Iran is in connection with Khuzestan, which is part of Iraq's soil and was annexed to Iran during foreign rule."

== See also ==
- Territorial dispute
- Irredentism
- Iraq
- Kuwait
- Shatt al-Arab
- Khuzestan
- Arab nationalism
- Iraqi nationalism
- Kingdom of Iraq
- First Republic of Iraq
- Ba'ath Party (Iraqi-dominated faction)
- Ba'athist Iraq
- Iran-Iraq War
- Gulf War
