= Matri =

Matri may refer to:

- Matri (mountain), in the Himalayas
- Matri (biblical figure), ancestor of Saul, the first King of Israel
- Alessandro Matri (born 19 August 1984), Italian footballer
- Matri (brand), an Indian menstrual wellness brand mymatri.com featured on Shark tank India Season 3, funded by Aman Gupta and Namita Thapar

== See also ==
- Matra (disambiguation)
- Pradhan Mantri Matri Vandana Yojana, a maternity benefit programme in India
