= Qasimism =

Iraqi nationalist ideology based on the thoughts and policies of Abd al-Karim Qasim

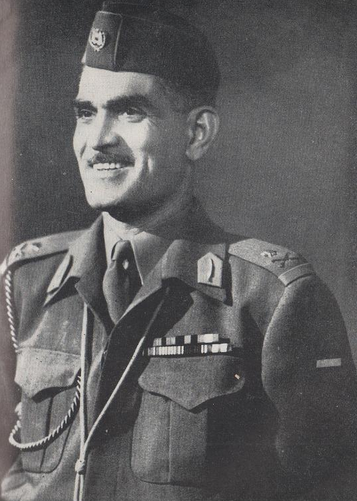
Portrait of Abd al-Karim Qasim

Qasimism (Arabic: التيار القاسمي, romanized: at-Tayyār al-Qāsimī) is an Iraqi nationalist ideology based on the thoughts and policies of Abd al-Karim Qasim, who ruled Iraq from 1958 until 1963.

== Ideology ==
Qasimism opposes Pan-Arabism, Pan-Iranism, Pan-Turkism, Turanism, Kurdish nationalism, and any ideology which affects the unity of Iraqi people and takes land from Iraq. The main policy of Qasimism is Iraqi nationalism, which is the unity and equality of all ethnicities in Iraq, including Arabs, Kurds, Turkmen, Assyrians, Armenians, Yazidis, and Mandaeans. It is very similar to composite nationalism, although Qasim viewed Iraqis as a single nation rather than a collection of nations. Abd al-Karim Qasim had many conflicts against Ba'athists, Pan-Arabists, and Kurdish separatists. In the Qasimism ideology, Iraq and Iraqis are put first and foremost. Qasimism also views Iraq's ancient Mesopotamian (Sumerian, Akkadian, Babylonian, Ancient Assyrian) identities as the core of Iraq and its people, and seeks to preserve them. Qasimism is a secular ideology which puts being Iraqi before any religion.

After the 1958 revolution, Qasim included Kurds in Article III of the Interim constitution, which recognized Kurds and Arabs as equal owners of the republic. He also gave many concessions to the Kurds. However, in 1960, amid disagreements with the Barzanis, Qasim began to support their rival tribes, eventually sparking a war in 1961.

Qasim refused to join the United Arab Republic, sparking tensions with Arab nationalists in Iraq.

Qasimism also has some irredentist influence due to Abd al-Karim Qasim and many Qasimists wanting Kuwait and Khuzestan province to be a part of Iraq. In fact, it was the Qasimists who created the belief that Kuwait and Khuzestan were rightful Iraqi lands, a belief which had also influenced Saddam Hussein, who further popularised it, made it public that it was his goal, and made it his motive for the Iraqi invasion of Kuwait and the Iran–Iraq War. Abdulkarim Qasim had also advocated for Iraqi annexation of Kurdish areas outside of Iraq, and had proposed an Iraqi annexation of Iranian Kurdistan, in addition to his attempts at annexing Khuzestan. After Abdulkarim Qasim made repetitive threats to annex Kuwait, the British launched Operation Vantage to deter Iraq from making claims on Kuwait.

Qasim viewed the army as a revolutionary force capable of liberating Iraq from both foreign colonialism and local feudalism, declaring himself a servant of the people rather than a charismatic ruler. He frequently emphasized his modesty, rejecting palace life and preferring to live in military quarters.

Nationalization and populism are more policies of Qasimism. Abd al-Karim Qasim was the one who overthrew the Kingdom of Iraq, which was established by the British, and he became the one to establish Iraqi rule over Iraq. Under Abd al-Karim Qasim, 99% of British-owned oil company lands were taken and distributed to the Iraqi civilian population. The Government of Iraq, under Qasim, along with five petroleum-exporting nations met at a conference held 10–14 September 1960 in Baghdad, which led to the creation of the International Organization of Petroleum-Exporting Countries (OPEC).

Qasimism seeks women to participate more in society and play a bigger role in the development of Iraq. This was encouraged by Abd al-Karim Qasim himself who rewrote the Iraqi constitution to guarantee more women's rights. Under Qasimist rule, Iraq appointed its first woman minister, Naziha al-Dulaimi, who was the first woman in the Arab world to hold a significant role. She inspired the 1959 Civil Affairs Law, which increased women's benefits in marriages and inheritance laws. She was instrumental in turning the vast slums of eastern Baghdad into a massive public work and housing project that came to be known as Thawra City – now Sadr City, once known as Saddam City.

== Symbols ==
The flag of Qasimist Iraq, with Pan-Arab colors representing Iraqi Arabs, yellow sun representing Kurds, and red rays representing Assyrians

The emblem of Qasimist Iraq, which is a combination of the Star of Ishtar and Shamash's solar symbol

Qasimist version of the Star of Ishtar

== See also ==
- Bourguibism
- Kemalism
- Nasserism
- Saddamism

== Sources ==
- Marr, Phebe (2004). The Modern History of Iraq. Westview Press. ISBN 9780813336152.
- Polk, William Roe (2005). Understanding Iraq. I.B. Tauris. ISBN 9780857717641.
- Simons, Geoff (1996). Iraq: From Sumer to Saddam. St. Martin's Press. ISBN 9780312160524.
