= Ras Al Khaimah Tourism Development Authority =

Tourism in the United Arab Emirates

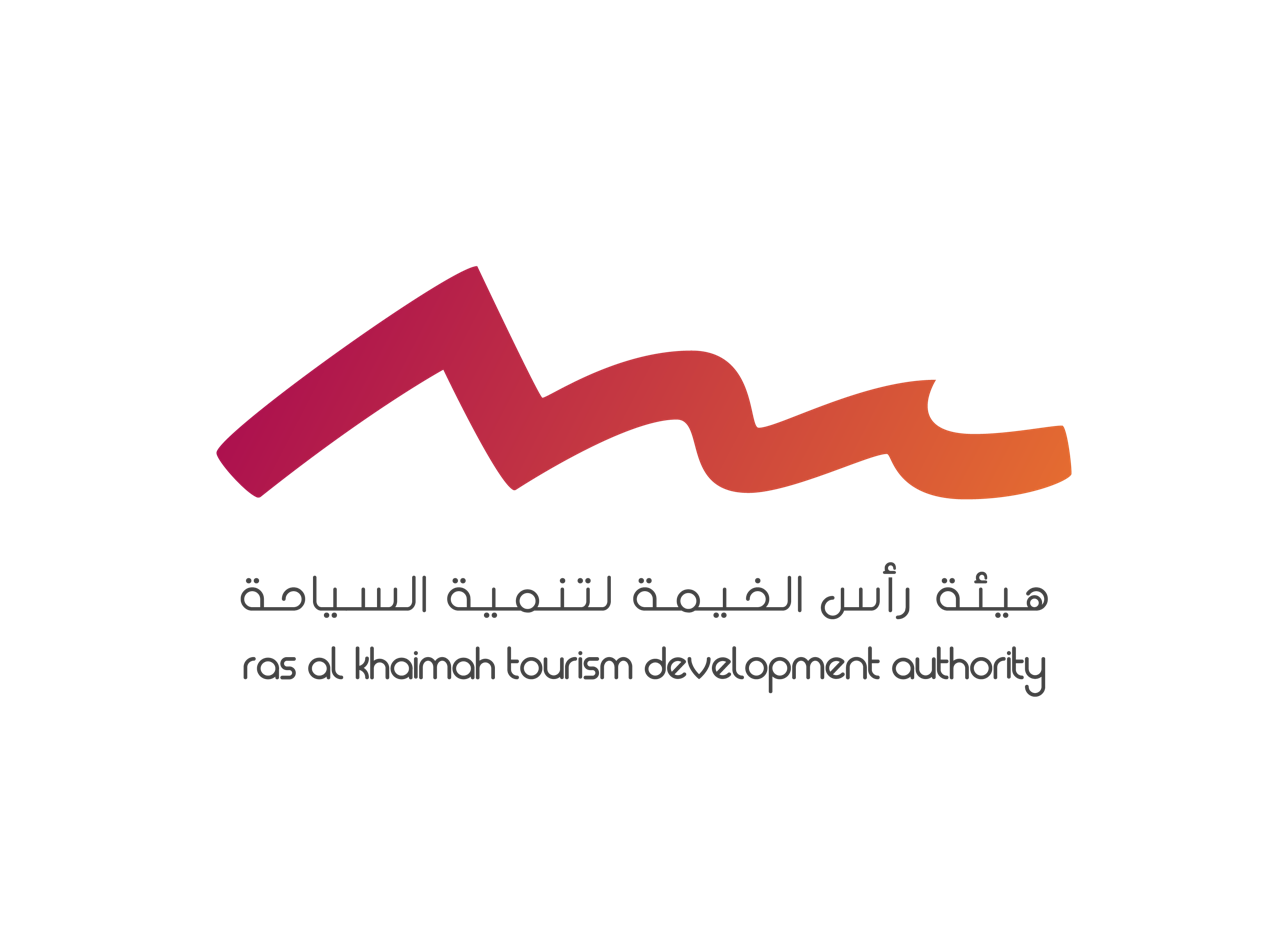

Agency overview
- Formed: May 2011; 14 years ago
- Jurisdiction: Emirate of Ras Al Khaimah
- Website: visitrasalkhaimah.com

The Ras Al Khaimah Tourism Development Authority (RAKTDA) was established in May 2011 under the Government of Ras Al Khaimah. Its purpose is to develop and promote the emirate's tourism offering and infrastructure, both domestically and abroad.

== Mission ==
In order to achieve target growth of one million visitors by the end of 2018, the authority aims establish Ras Al Khaimah as a compelling destination for leisure and business travel, create sustainable investment opportunities and enhance the quality of life for its residents. In order to achieve its goals, RAK TDA has a government mandate to license, regulate and monitor the emirate's tourism and hospitality industry.

== Activities ==
RAKTDA promotes the emirate's tourism products and services through a wide range of activities, including research and analysis of current tourism trends and future projects; representation of the destination at travel shows; educating travel professionals on Ras Al Khaimah's attractions through workshops, roadshows and training programmes; coordinating and implementing joint initiatives and co-marketing opportunities with industry partners; branding and marketing strategies to encourage tourism and investment into the emirate; media and consumer campaigns and promotions; and hosting sporting, cultural, trade and CSR events.

== Chief Executive ==
- Raki Phillips is the current CEO of RAKTDA.
- Haitham Mattar (2015 - 2019)
- Steven Rice (2013 - 2015)
