= Kappa Pegasi =

Triple star system in the constellation Pegasus

- Location of Kappa Pegasi (circled)

Observation data Epoch J2000 Equinox ICRS
- Constellation: Pegasus
- Right ascension: 21^{h} 44^{m} 38.7344^{s}
- Declination: +25° 38′ 42.128″
- Apparent magnitude (V): 4.159

Characteristics
- Spectral type: F5IV
- U−B color index: +0.03
- B−V color index: +0.44

Astrometry
Radial velocity (R_{v})	−8.1 km/s
Proper motion (μ)	RA: 46.66 mas/yr Dec.: 13.47 mas/yr
Parallax (π)	28.90±0.18 mas
Distance	112.9 ± 0.7 ly (34.6 ± 0.2 pc)

Orbit
Primary	κ Peg A
Name	κ Peg B
Period (P)	4227.05 ± 0.55 d
Semi-major axis (a)	8.139 ± 0.062 AU
Eccentricity (e)	0.3180 ± 0.0015
Inclination (i)	107.872 ± 0.028°
Longitude of the node (Ω)	109.140 ± 0.057°
Periastron epoch (T)	2452398.0 ± 2.0
Argument of periastron (ω) (secondary)	304.14 ± 0.21°

Orbit
Primary	κ Peg Ba
Name	κ Peg Bb
Period (P)	5.9714971 ± 0.0000013
Semi-major axis (a)	0.08715 ± 0.00090 AU
Eccentricity (e)	0.0073 ± 0.0013
Inclination (i)	124.9 ± 3.7°
Longitude of the node (Ω)	359.1 ± 5.9°
Periastron epoch (T)	2452402.225 ± 0.097
Argument of periastron (ω) (secondary)	359.1 ± 5.9°

Details

A
Mass	1.391±0.044 M_{☉}
Surface gravity (log g)	3.00 cgs
Temperature	6,579 K
Metallicity [Fe/H]	-0.37 dex
Rotational velocity (v sin i)	35 km/s

Ba
Mass	1.616±0.049 M_{☉}

Bb
Mass	0.835±0.026 M_{☉}

Other designations
- 10 Pegasi, HR 8315, BD+24 4463, HD 206901, SAO 89949, HIP 107354.

Database references
SIMBAD	data

Kappa Pegasi (κ Peg, κ Pegasi) is a triple star system in the constellation Pegasus. It has an apparent brightness of +4.13 magnitude and belongs to the spectral class F5IV; a subgiant star. No proper name is associated to this star.

This system consists of two components, designated Kappa Pegasi A and B, that are separated by an angular distance of 0.235 arcseconds. The binary nature of this pair was discovered by Sherburne W. Burnham in 1880. They orbit around each other every 11.6 years with a semimajor axis of 0.4 arcseconds. The brighter member of the pair, Kappa Pegasi B, is actually a spectroscopic binary, with the components designated Kappa Pegasi Ba and Kappa Pegasi Bb. They orbit about each other every six days. There is a fourth component, Kappa Pegasi C, which may be an optical companion.
