= Amira Hilmi Matar =

Egyptian scholar of Philosophy

- Born: 1930 (age 95–96); Cairo, Egypt
- Education: BA in philosophy; MA in Political Science; MA, PhD in Philosophy
- Occupations: scholar, professor, writer
- Awards: She was awarded the State Encouragement Prize in Social Sciences from the Supreme Council of; She received the State Award for Excellence in Social Sciences from the Supreme Council of Culture, 2004; She was awarded the Medal of Science and Arts.

Amira Hilmi Matar (Arabic: أميرة حلمي مطر) is an Egyptian scholar and writer born in 1930. She holds a PhD in philosophy from Cairo University. She has several studies, research and translations in philosophy. She won several awards including the State Encouragement Prize in Social Sciences from the Supreme Council of Culture in 1985.

== Education and career ==
Amira Hilmi Mata was born in Hadayek El Kobba in Cairo in 1930. Her father is a senior engineer and holds a PhD in chemical engineering from the University of Manchester in England. Amira studies at the Girls’ College in Zamalek, then studied at the Faculty of Arts, Department of Philosophy at Cairo University. Matar was the only woman student out of thirty men students. In 1952, she obtained her bachelor's degree and was the first in her class. Three years after her graduation, she was appointed as a lecturer in the same department. Matar also studied political science and obtained a master's degree in it. In 1955, she obtained a second master's degree in philosophy from Cairo University. Years later, she married and earned a PhD in philosophy from the same university in 1961. She studied at the hands of great professors in philosophy including Abd al-Rahman Badawi, Mustafa Suef, and Zaki Naguib Mahmoud.

Matar was the Dean of the philosophy department at Cairo University from 1975 until 1981. She was a member of the Greek Philosophy Association, the Egyptian Philosophy Society, the Philosophy Committee of the Supreme Council of Culture and others. In addition, Matar has published more than 5 books on philosophy and numerous studies and research papers in philosophy. Matar is fluent in many languages such as ancient Greek, Greek, English, and French. She has also translated several philosophy books from English and Greek into Arabic including "Republic" by Plato. In 1985, she received the State Incentive Award in Social Sciences from the Supreme Council of Culture, the State Award for Excellence in Social Sciences in 2004, and was awarded the Order of Sciences and Arts of the first class in Egypt.

== Awards and honors ==
- She was awarded the State Encouragement Prize in Social Sciences from the Supreme Council of Culture, 1985.
- She received the State Award for Excellence in Social Sciences from the Supreme Council of Culture, 2004.
- She was awarded the Medal of Science and Arts.
