= Maryam Matar =

UAE geneticist (born 1975)

Her Excellency Maryam Matar
- Born: مريم مطر; 1975 (age 50–51)
- Occupations: Scientist; Undersecretary, UAE Ministry of Health; Chairperson, UAE Genetic Diseases Association
- Known for: Founder of the UAE Genetic Diseases Association; First female director-general of a Dubai government agency
- Medical career
- Profession: Physician; geneticist
- Field: Biology
- Sub-specialties: Genetics
- Research: Genetic disorders

Maryam Mohamed Fatma Matar (مريم مطر, born 1975) is an Emirati geneticist, medical researcher, and radio host, based in the United Arab Emirates (UAE). Matar is the first woman to serve as director-general in the government of Dubai and is the founder and chairperson of the UAE Genetic Diseases Association.

== Early life and education ==
Matar grew up in a large family with nine brothers and sisters. Her grandmother was an herbalist, which Matar notes led to her own interest in helping people.

Matar earned a B.A. in Medicine and Surgery and a Family Medicine Residency Program degree. In 2004, she graduated from the H.H. Sheikh Mohammed Bin Rashid Program for Leadership Development and worked on a Ph.D. at Yamaguchi University in Japan.

== Career ==
In 2006, Matar was named an undersecretary in the Dubai Government Ministry of Health, and in 2008 she was named director-general of a Dubai government agency, Community Development Authority, thereby becoming the first Emirati woman to hold these positions. As of 2014, Matar is the deputy chair of the primary education advocacy organization Dubai Cares.

== Biography ==
In 2004, Matar founded and directs the UAE Genetic Diseases Association, a volunteer organization in the UAE that works on issues centering around illnesses such as thalassemia, Alzheimer's, autism, and celiac diseases. This work has led to new screenings for genetic mutations in children, as Matar discussed in a 2017 article in Gulf News, and genetic testing for breast cancer, as Matar discussed in 2018 with the Khaleej Times. She also founded the UAE's Down Syndrome Association, which came about after she helped a mother at the beach who had a child with Down syndrome. In 2017, Matar gave the keynote speech at an event honoring healthcare professionals in the UAE.

Matar has spoken in the press about rare diseases in the UAE, about periods of time when women should avoid making important decisions, about funding for health care initiatives in the UAE, and challenges for women in the UAE during the COVID-19 pandemic. She has co-hosted a daily radio program, "Akhirlak" about public health in the UAE.

In 2012, Matar was named one of the 100 most powerful Arab women by Arabian Business magazine, and, in April 2015, as one of the "100 most powerful Arabs under 40" in Science. She was recognized by the Islamic Sciences Journal as among the most influential Muslim female scientists, in 2014. Matar has twice been ranked fourth among Arab researchers and "the most powerful Emirati female researcher in science", according to The Arab Weekly, which also reported, in 2018, that Matar aspired to be the first Arab woman to be awarded a Nobel Peace Prize.

== Honors and awards ==
In 2023 Matar was one of the women awarded an 'Emirati Women of Achievement Award' and received the Women in Tech lifetime achievement award. In 2025 Arabian Business named Matar one of their 100 Most Inspiring Women.

== Selected publications ==
- Matar, Maryam, Naveed, Mohammed, Salim, Sajala, Hareb, Nevin, Alba, Emayla, Hino, Minako, Nitta, Takenori, Adhiyanto, Chris, Yamashiro, Yasuhiro, Hattori, Yukio (2011). "Internet-based approach to population screening for common hemoglobinopathies in United Arab Emirates". NHS Nursing & Health Sciences. 13 (2): 105–113. doi:10.1111/j.1442-2018.2011.00599.x. ISSN 1441-0745. OCLC 5156455549. PMID 21595813.
- Adhiyanto, Chris; Yamashiro, Yasuhiro; Hattori, Yukio; Nitta, Takenori; Hino, Minako; Matar, Maryam; Takagi, Fumiya; Kimoto, Masafumi (2013-06-01). "A New β0-Thalassemia Mutation (codon 102, AAC>ATCAC) in Coexistence with a Heterozygous P4.2 Nippon Gene". Hemoglobin. 37 (3): 227–240. doi:10.3109/03630269.2013.777847. ISSN 0363-0269. PMID 23600595. S2CID 23308936.
- Laurance, Jeremy; Henderson, Sarah; Howitt, Peter J.; Matar, Mariam; Al Kuwari, Hanan; Edgman-Levitan, Susan; Darzi, Ara (2014-09-01). "Patient Engagement: Four Case Studies That Highlight The Potential For Improved Health Outcomes And Reduced Costs". Health Affairs. 33 (9): 1627–1634. doi:10.1377/hlthaff.2014.0375. hdl:10044/1/60409. ISSN 0278-2715. PMID 25201668.
