= Haitham Mattar =

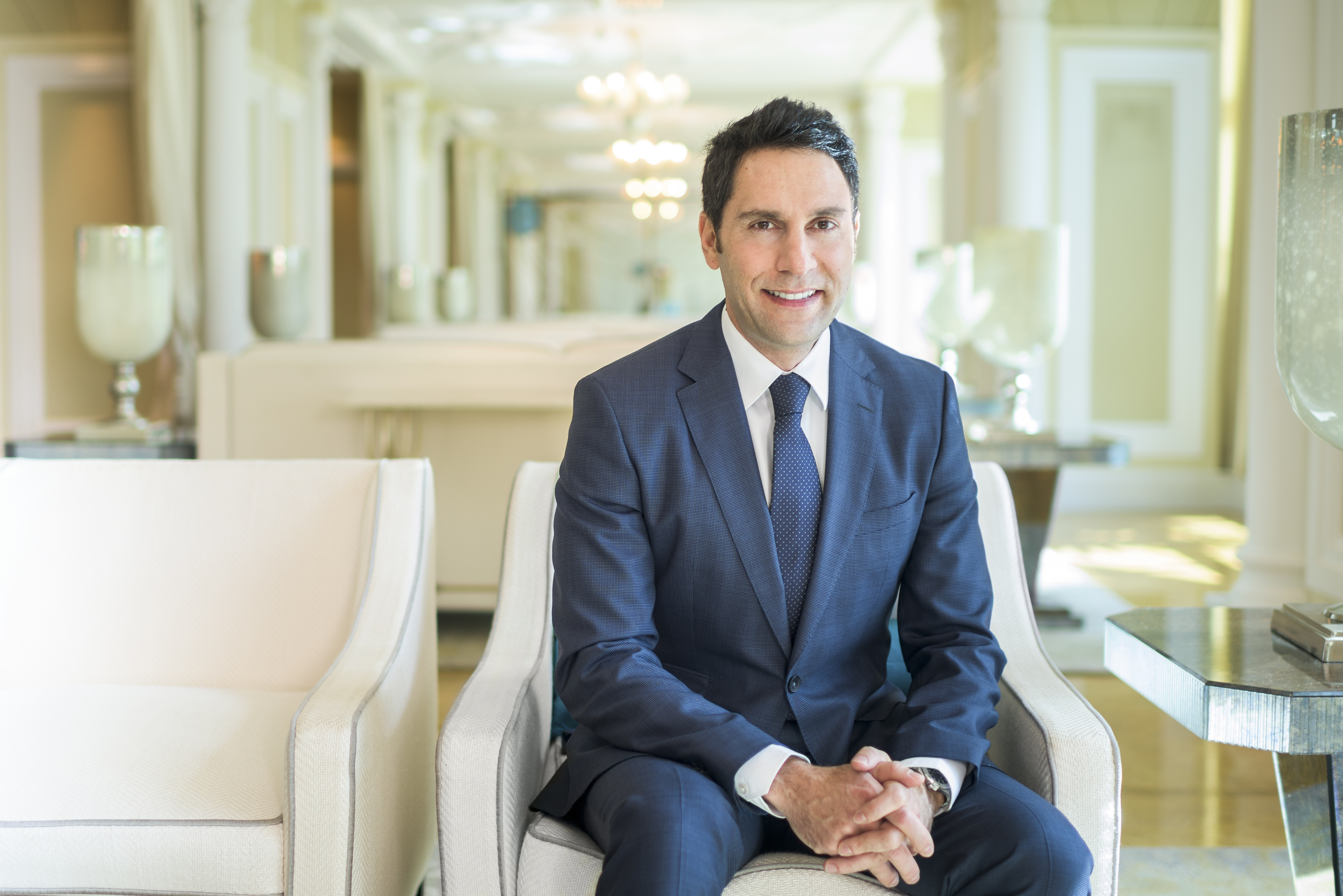
- Haitham Mattar in 2015
- Born: Lebanon
- Citizenship: American
- Education: University of Liverpool
- Occupation: Business executive
- Known for: Former CEO of the Ras Al Khaimah Tourism Development Authority

Haitham Mattar is a Lebanese-American business executive and former CEO of the Ras Al Khaimah Tourism Development Authority.

Starting in 2015, Matter successfully repositioned Ras Al Khaimah in the United Arab Emirates to become one of the fastest growing international tourism destinations, exceeding the target of one million visitors in the first three years. He was also instrumental in the concept and delivery of tourism demand generators including the Jebel Jais Flight, at that time the world's longest zipline, and the region's first Via Ferrata.

Mattar later worked for the Saudi Ministry of Tourism, advising on developing and implementing Saudi's tourism strategy. In April 2021, Mattar was appointed as the managing director for India, Middle East & Africa by IHG Hotels & Resorts.

== Early life and education ==
Matter was born in Lebanon and is an American citizen and Arabic speaker. Mattar obtained an MBA in marketing from the University of Liverpool, United Kingdom.

== Career ==
Since starting his career in hospitality in 1987, Mattar has held senior roles with global hotel brands, including Marriott, InterContinental Hotels Group (IHG) and Hilton Worldwide.

In 2005, Mattar assumed the role of Director of Sales and Marketing at InterContinental Hotels Group, where he was responsible for the sales & marketing functions at properties in the Middle East and Africa region. In 2009, he was appointed as Area General Manager - Lebanon & Commercial Director Near East, overseeing the operational & commercial functions for IHG's hotels in Lebanon, Libya, Egypt, Jordan and Syria.

As Regional Vice President of Marketing and Sales for Hilton, Mattar was responsible for the development of source markets, Global and National Sales & Marketing offices as well as the development and implementation of Marketing & Sales strategy of over 130 properties across the Middle East, Africa, Eastern Europe, Turkey and Russia.

As CEO of the Ras Al Khaimah Tourism Development Authority, Mattar was responsible for Ras Al Khaimah's brand positioning, destination marketing, tourism development and growth strategy. During the time Mattar has assumed the role of CEO, Ras Al Khaimah has recorded rapid economic progress and unprecedented growth in tourism figures.

In April 2021, Mattar took over the role of managing director of India, Middle East & Africa (IMEA) for IHG Hotels & Resorts.

== Recognition ==
In 2018, Matter was named ‘Tourism Promotion CEO of the Year’ at the Global CEO Excellence Awards. He was also featured in the Arabian Business ‘most powerful Arabs’ list, in addition to being named one of the top 100 smartest people in the UAE. Also names ‘Leisure and Tourism CEO of the Year’ at the CEO Middle East Awards and ‘Business Leader of the Year’ at the Hospitality Excellence Awards in 2018.

In 2017, Mattar was elected as Vice Chair of the UNWTO Board of Affiliate Members as well as being appointed as a member of the steering committee for the UNWTO 2017 International Year for sustainable development in Tourism. Mattar was also named a full-time advisory board member of the Global Thinkers Forum (GTF) in 2018, and an Advisory Board Member of Al Marjan Development. Mattar is also a member of the Steering Committee of the Ras Al Khaimah Department of Economy and was appointed in 2018 as a member of the Arabian Travel Market Advisory Board by Reed Travel Exhibitions. In August 2018 Ras Al Khaimah Tourism Development Authority joined WTTC as a member, being represented by Mattar.
