= Selim Matar =

Iraqi-Swiss historian and writer (born 1956)

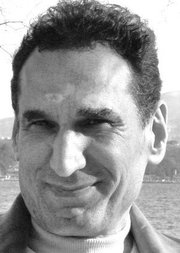
- Born: 1956 (age 69–70); Baghdad, Iraq
- Other name: Salim Matar
- Education: Graduate Institute of International and Development Studies
- Occupations: Writer, novelist, historian, academic
- Known for: Iraqi nationalism
- Spouse: Marguerite Gavillet
- Children: 1
- Website: http://www.salim.mesopot.com

Selim Matar (born 1956) is an Iraqi-Swiss writer, historian, and public intellectual who is the founder and editor-in-chief of the journal Mesopotamia. Much of his body of work meditates on the nature of Iraqi nationalism; his concepts and theories, centring on the "Identity of the Iraqi Nation", gave rise to the eponymous cultural movement that grew out of it. He is chiefly known for his works The Woman of the Flask and The Wounded Self.

== Biography ==
Selim Matar was born in Baghdad in 1956 as the fourth of eight children to Shia parents Matar (Note: Selim Matar was given a patronym from his father in lieu of a surname, as is common in Arabic naming conventions. Unique to Iraq, it lacks the ibn particle. Following his move to Switzerland, he adopted Matar as his formal surname.) and Wabria. Originally from Amarah in the southern Maysa governorate, his parents had moved to the capital before his birth and opened a bistro next to the Directorate of General Security, where the young Selim often worked after school. Delivering food and drinks in the Directorate, he occasionally bore witness to scenes of torture. Growing up poor in one of the city's richest neighbourhoods and attending a majority-Christian school, he had greater exposure to Western products and ideas than the norm for Baghdadi youth at the time, leading him to embrace atheism and a progressive outlook.

After a brief stint in the Ba'ath student wing, he joined the Iraqi Communist Party as a teenager. His autobiography recounts it as a seminal moment: "The poor boy from the south whose dream was limited to being accepted by a family, however small, was suddenly part of this large international family made up of magnificent Europeans, blond, civilised and full of illustrious characters: Lenin, Marx, Engels, Mao, Castro as well as other intellectuals, scientists, politicians and activists." He initially worked as a civil servant to support his family before fleeing to Bulgaria in late 1978 on party orders after the communists were removed from the National Progressive Front and subjected to repression by Saddam Hussein.

In exile, he was initially involved with the party's Al-Ansar paramilitary wing; after spending three months in Sofia with fellow exiles, Matar was transferred to a Palestinian military camp in Lebanon for combat training. Kicked out of the camp after a week for criticising the party's bureaucratic structure, he subsequently migrated throughout the Middle East over the following two years, "accumulating experiences that were as revolutionary and impulsive as they were naïve and thoughtless..." He became intensely disillusioned by the Iraqi opposition's factionalism and infighting, which was further worsened by the manipulations of secret service infiltrators and external groups: "They used us as pawns on a chessboard by sheltering behind revolutionary slogans. We were puppets."

Deeming himself unfit for the life of a militant, Matar decided instead to serve the Iraqi cause through cultural avenues and made plans to seek an education in Europe; after securing an Italian visa, he moved to Rome in late 1980 and spent the following eight months in abject poverty. With only a meagre income from drawing tourists' caricatures, he often resorted to sleeping in squats and begging from churches in order to survive. Matar's first attempted move to Switzerland was aborted when his money and documents were stolen; he finally settled in Geneva in late 1981 and enrolled in the Graduate Institute of International and Development Studies, specialising in Social Sciences and research in the Third World.

Matar currently lives in Geneva with his wife Marguerite, a professor of Arabic at the University of Geneva. Their son Bassim, born in 1990, works as an IT specialist in Morges.

== Theories on nationalism and the "identity of the Iraqi nation" ==
In Switzerland, Matar distanced himself from communism for its internationalist and economic viewpoint, which he considers to be in conflict with national identity and the importance of culture, as well as its basis in materialism, which conflicts with his view of spirituality. In his biography, he recounts how the Communist Party "only ever taught me to criticize and despise [Iraq's] traditions, its heritage and its history, and to revolt against the State and society (...) In all the cultural meetings of the party that I attended, in the numerous books and documents that I studied, never was Iraqi history and civilization mentioned, nor its people, its towns and villages, its ethnic or confessional groups… Everything we were taught about our country was limited to the struggle of the Communist Party, the struggle of the proletarians, the peasant revolts, and the Kurdish cause." Breaking from his initial worldview as a "universalist materialist", he redefined himself as a "spiritual humanist": a defence of cultural diversity, recognising the plural nature of national identity, believing in cosmic forces without basis in a specific religion, and being open to studying diverse beliefs from around the world.

One of Matar's fundamental theses is that "the exterior is the reflection of the interior; every individual essence contains also the essence of the universe. Therefore, individual identity is the basis of all other forms of identity. If we do not believe in ourselves and in what surrounds us, we cannot believe in the collectivity and what lies further. Therefore, if we are not attached to our own people and own identity, we cannot be attached to humanity as a whole." From this foundation, Matar began to fixate on the concept of national identity, in particular the identity of Iraqis in exile. A central focus of his body of work, beginning with The Woman of The Flask, has been the "identity of the Iraqi nation", which developed into a cultural movement of the same name. The movement's genesis proper can be traced to the publication of The Wounded Self in 1996, a treatise on the crisis of national identity in the face of conflict and exile.

Matar's adherence to pacifism, belief in national unity and opposition to ethnic and religious sectarianism has been the source of controversy inside and outside of Iraq.

== Selected bibliography ==
Matar is the author of several treatises, essays, novels and short stories, which he has made available free of charge.

=== Principal works ===
- Imra’at al-Qârûra (1990; English translation: The Woman of the Flask) 1990 Recipient of the "Al-Naqed" Prize for best Arabic novel.
- Al-Dhât al-djarîha (1996; English translation: Wounded Identity/The Wounded Self) .
- I’tirâfât radjulin lâ yastahyî (2008; English translation: The Confessions of a Man without Shame) Partially adapted into a play in 2010.
- Al-munazammât al-sirriyah (2001; English translation: The Secret Societies)
- Al-Irâq, saba’tu alâf 'âm min al-hayât (2013; English translation: 7000 Years of Living History)
- La Planète de l'extase (2022; English translation: The Planet of Ecstasy)

=== Other works ===
- Al-taw’am al-mafqûd (2000; English translation: The Lost Twin)
- Djadal a-huwiyyât (2003; English translation: The Debate of Identities)
- Al-Irâq al-djadîd wa-l-fikr al-djadîd (2001; English translation: The New Iraq and the New Thought)
- Bagdad – Genève: A la recherche d’une patrie (2011; English translation: Baghdad – Geneva: In search of a homeland)
- Yaqzat al-huwiyyah al-irâqiyya (2011; English translation: The Awakening of Iraqi Identity)
- Mashrû' al-ihyâh al-watanî al-'irâqî (2012; English translation: The Project of the Rebirth of the Iraqi Nation)

=== Selected editions of Mesopotamia (Journal) ===
In 2004, Matar published the first issue of the journal Mesopotamia, focusing primarily on Iraqi culture and history. Since its founding, he has also served as editor-in-chief.

1. Khamsat alâf 'âm min al-unûtha al-'irâqiyyah (2004; English translation: 5000 Years of Iraqi Femininity) Detailing the history of Iraqi women from ancient times to the modern day.

2. Mawsû’ah al-madâ’in al’irâqiyyah (2005; English translation: Encyclopedia of Iraqi Cities) Laying out the geography and history of Iraqi provinces and their principal cities.

3. Khamsat alâf 'âm min al-tadayyun al-'irâqî (2006; English translation: 5000 Years of Iraqi Religiosity) Detailing the history of the different religions and confessions of Iraq.

4. Mawsû’at Kirkuk qalb al-'Irâq (2008; English translation: Encyclopedia of Kirkûk, the Heart of Iraq) Dedicated to the history and geography of the Kirkuk Governorate, as well as its demographics and culture.

5. Mawsû’at al-lughât al-'irâqiyyah (2008; English translation: Encyclopedia of Iraqi Languages) An encyclopedia of the languages spoken in Iraq throughout the centuries, living and dead, as well as the cultures of its linguistic communities.

6. Mawsû’at al-bî’ah al-'irâqiyyah (2010; English translation: Encyclopedia of the Iraqi Environment) Detailing the geology and nature of Iraq, as well as the ecological challenges caused by industry, conflict, and pollution.

== See also ==
- Diaspora studies
- Iraqi nationalism
- Iraqi diaspora
