= Matra (disambiguation) =

Matra is a French company covering a wide range of activities mainly related to automobile, aeronautics and weaponry.

Matra or MATRA may also refer to:

- Equipe Matra Sports, Matra's sports car division, former Formula One constructor

== Other uses ==
- Mátra, a mountain range in Hungary
- 1513 Mátra, an asteroid named after Hungarian mountain range
- Matra, Haute-Corse, a commune of the Haute-Corse department in France, on the island of Corsica
- Matra (music), a beat in Indian classical music

== See also ==
- Matri (disambiguation)
- Muttrah (Matrah), city in Oman
- Maatr, 2017 Indian thriller film by Ashtar Sayed
- Maattrraan, 2012 Indian film by K. V. Anand
