= USS Matar =

Liberty ship of WWII

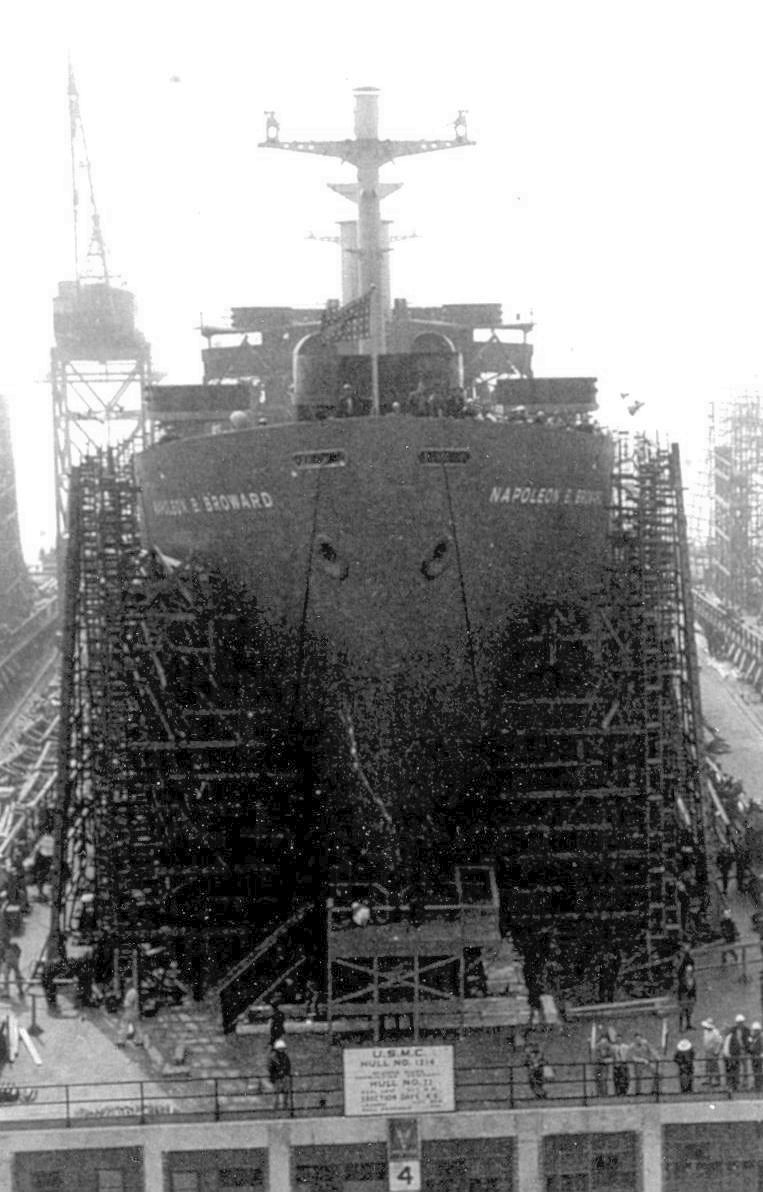
- SS Napoleon B. Broward, 30 November 1943 at St. Johns River Shipbuilding Corp., Jacksonville, Florida

History

United States
- Name: Napoleon B. Broward
- Namesake: Napoleon B. Broward
- Owner: War Shipping Administration (WSA)
- Ordered: as a type (EC2-S-C1) hull, MC hull 1214
- Awarded: 4 March 1942
- Builder: St. Johns River Shipbuilding Company, Jacksonville, Florida
- Cost: $1,364,963
- Yard number: 22
- Way number: 4
- Laid down: 16 October 1943
- Launched: 30 November 1943
- Sponsored by: Mrs. Napoleon Broward
- Completed: 10 December 1943
- Fate: Transferred to US Navy, 10 December 1943
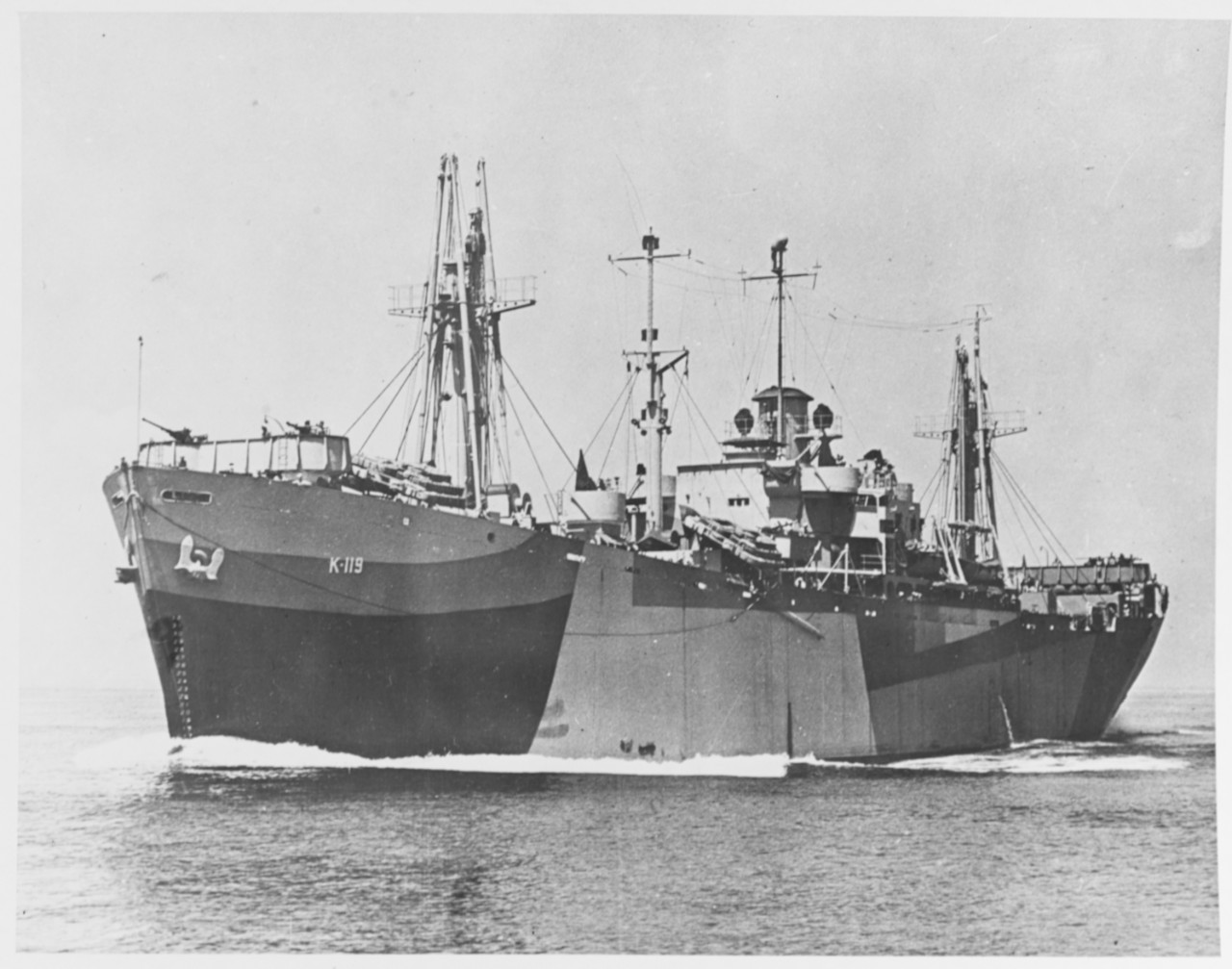
- USS Matar (AK-119), off Jacksonville, Florida, 18 May 1944.

United States
- Name: Matar
- Namesake: The star Matar
- Acquired: 10 December 1943
- Commissioned: 17 May 1944
- Decommissioned: 15 March 1946
- Stricken: 31 October 1947
- Identification: Hull symbol: AK-119; Call sign: NTNW
- Fate: Sold for scrapping, 13 April 1971, removed from fleet, 21 May 1971
- Notes: Name did not revert when laid up in Reserve Fleet

General characteristics
- Class & type: Crater-class cargo ship
- Displacement: 4,023 long tons (4,088 t) (standard); 14,550 long tons (14,780 t) (full load)
- Length: 441 ft 6 in (134.57 m)
- Beam: 56 ft 11 in (17.35 m)
- Draft: 28 ft 4 in (8.64 m)
- Installed power: 2 × Oil fired 450 °F (232 °C) boilers, operating at 220 psi (1,500 kPa) , (manufactured by Combustion Engineering); 2,500 shp (1,900 kW)
- Propulsion: 1 × Vertical triple-expansion reciprocating steam engine, (manufactured by General Machinery Corp., Hamilton, Ohio); 1 × screw propeller
- Speed: 12.5 kn (23.2 km/h; 14.4 mph)
- Capacity: 7,800 t (7,700 long tons) DWT; 444,206 cu ft (12,578.5 m^{3}) (non-refrigerated)
- Complement: 289
- Armament: 1 × 5 in (130 mm)/38 caliber dual purpose gun; 4 × 40 mm (1.6 in) 40mm Bofors anti-aircraft gun mounts; 6 × 20 mm (0.79 in) Oerlikon cannons anti-aircraft gun mounts

USS Matar (AK-119) was a Crater-class cargo ship, converted from a Liberty Ship, commissioned by the US Navy for service in World War II. She was first named after Napoleon B. Broward, an American river pilot, captain, and politician; he was elected as the 19th Governor of the US state of Florida. She was renamed and commissioned after Matar, a binary star in the constellation of Pegasus. She was responsible for delivering troops, goods and equipment to locations in the war zone.

== Construction ==
Napoleon R. Broward was laid down on 16 October 1943, under Maritime Commission (MARCOM) contract, MC hull 1214, by the St. Johns River Shipbuilding Company, Jacksonville, Florida; she was sponsored by Mrs. Napoleon B. Broward, widow of the namesake, and launched 30 November 1943. Acquired by the US Navy under bareboat charter 10 December 1943; converted for Navy use by Merrill Stevens Drydock & Repair Co., Jacksonville; and commissioned as Matar at Jacksonville, 17 May 1944.

== Service history ==
After completing conversion, Matar steamed to Norfolk, Virginia, 28 May, for shakedown in Chesapeake Bay. Thence, she loaded cargo at Davisville, Rhode Island, and Bayonne, New Jersey, before departing New York, for the Pacific Ocean 25 June, arriving Pearl Harbor, 25 July. Matar discharged cargo and refilled her holds with ammunition, field rations, and amphibious equipment. Operating under Service Squadron 8, she sailed with units of task force TF 31 on 20 August, for the Palaus.

Steaming via the Marshalls and the Admiralties, Matar reached Kossol Passage, 20 September. As flagship for CTG 31.4, she operated at Kossol, until 17 October, when she departed for Angaur Island. From 19 to 24 October, she discharged cargo into boats for transfer to the beaches; thence, she embarked Marines and amphibious tanks at Peleliu, and sailed for the Russell Islands, 30 October. She debarked her troops there 7 November; arrived off Guadalcanal, 9 November; and embarked 130 troops. Departing Lunga, 18 November, she arrived San Francisco, California, via Pearl Harbor, 11 December.

Altered for duty as a stores issue ship and loaded with medical supplies and ship's stores, Matar departed San Francisco, 18 January 1945, and arrived Eniwetok, 8 February. Assigned to Service Squadron 10, she steamed to the Marianas between 10 and 14 February. For the next 3 months she operated out of Saipan and Guam, dispensing medical and general stores to the fleet.

Matar arrived Kerama Retto, the Ryūkyūs, 14 May; discharged some cargo; and shifted to the anchorage off Hagushi, Okinawa, 29 May. She issued dry provisions and medical stores, and in addition provided smoke cover during enemy airstrikes. On 27 June, she sailed for Ulithi and Pearl Harbor.

Replenishing there between 2 and 14 August, she steamed to Eniwetok, thence to Japan, 7 September, arriving Tokyo Bay, 15 September, to service ships on occupation duty in Japanese waters. She completed this duty early in November, and between 5 November and 1 December, steamed via Pearl Harbor, to San Francisco.

== Decommissioning ==
Matar sailed 6 February 1946, for Pearl Harbor, arrived 15 February, and decommissioned 15 March 1946. She transferred to the custody of MARCOM 8 October 1947, and entered the Suisun Bay Reserve Fleet, Suisun Bay, California. Her name was struck from the Navy List 31 October 1947. She was sold for scrapping to Levin Metals Corp., on 13 April 1971, for $44,133, and withdrawn from the fleet on 21 May 1971.

== Military awards and honors ==
Matar received two battle stars for World War II service and her crew was eligible for the following medals and campaign ribbons:

- American Campaign Medal
- Asiatic-Pacific Campaign Medal
  - Western Caroline Islands operation (Capture and occupation of southern Palau Islands -Angaur Island, 19 to 24 October 1944)
  - Okinawa Gunto operation (Assault and occupation of Okinawa Gunto, 14 May to 27 June 1945)
- World War II Victory Medal
- Navy Occupation Service Medal (with Asia clasp)

== Bibliography ==
- "St. John's River Shipbuilding, Jacksonville FL". www.ShipbuildingHistory.com. 16 October 2010.
- Maritime Administration. "Napoleon B. Broward". Ship History Database Vessel Status Card. U.S. Department of Transportation, Maritime Administration.
- "USS Matar (AK-119)". NavSource. 13 June 2014.
- "Matar". Dictionary of American Naval Fighting Ships. Naval History and Heritage Command. 6 August 2015. This article incorporates text from this source, which is in the public domain.
- "SS Napoleon B. Broward".
