= Nu Pegasi =

Star in the constellation Pegasus

- Location of ν Pegasi (circled)

Observation data Epoch J2000 Equinox ICRS
- Constellation: Pegasus
- Right ascension: 22^{h} 05^{m} 40.75170^{s}
- Declination: +05° 03′ 30.7201″
- Apparent magnitude (V): 4.84

Characteristics
- Evolutionary stage: red giant branch
- Spectral type: K4III
- U−B color index: +1.80
- B−V color index: +1.44
- Variable type: suspected

Astrometry
Radial velocity (R_{v})	−18.90 km/s
Proper motion (μ)	RA: +101.759 mas/yr Dec.: +100.923 mas/yr
Parallax (π)	12.4810±0.3322 mas
Distance	261 ± 7 ly (80 ± 2 pc)
Absolute magnitude (M_{V})	0.26

Details
Mass	1.13 M_{☉}
Radius	24.57 R_{☉}
Luminosity	149 L_{☉}
Surface gravity (log g)	1.72 cgs
Temperature	4,073 K
Metallicity [Fe/H]	+0.02 dex
Rotational velocity (v sin i)	2.3 km/s
Age	8.1+2.3 −0.4 Gyr

Other designations
- ν Peg, 22 Pegasi, NSV 14020, BD+04°4800, GC 30894, HD 209747, HIP 109068, HR 8413, SAO 127285

Database references
SIMBAD	data

ν Pegasi, Latinized as Nu Pegasi is a single star in the northern constellation of Pegasus. It is an orange-hued star that is faintly visible to the naked eye with an apparent visual magnitude of 4.84. The star is located approximately 261 light years away based on parallax, but is drifting closer with a radial velocity of −19 km/s.

This is an aging giant star, most likely (94% chance) on the red giant branch, with a stellar classification of K4III. It is a suspected variable, with a magnitude range observed from 4.83 to 4.86. With the supply of hydrogen at its core exhausted, the star has cooled and expanded to 24.6 times the Sun's radius. It is 13% more massive than the Sun and is radiating 149 times the Sun's luminosity from its swollen photosphere at an effective temperature of 4,073 K.
