= Omicron Pegasi =

Star in the constellation Pegasus

- Location of ο Pegasi (circled in red)

Observation data Epoch J2000 Equinox ICRS
- Constellation: Pegasus
- Right ascension: 22^{h} 41^{m} 45.39893^{s}
- Declination: +29° 18′ 27.5542″
- Apparent magnitude (V): +4.80

Characteristics
- Spectral type: A1 IV
- U−B color index: +0.035
- B−V color index: −0.013±0.002

Astrometry
Radial velocity (R_{v})	+8.5±0.1 km/s
Proper motion (μ)	RA: −0.106 mas/yr Dec.: −31.691 mas/yr
Parallax (π)	11.4116±0.4055 mas
Distance	290 ± 10 ly (88 ± 3 pc)
Absolute magnitude (M_{V})	−0.01

Details
Mass	2.24 M_{☉}
Radius	3.37±0.10 R_{☉}
Luminosity	85±6 L_{☉}
Surface gravity (log g)	3.81±0.04 cgs
Temperature	9,600±50 K
Metallicity [Fe/H]	+0.25±0.09 dex
Rotational velocity (v sin i)	6.0±0.2 km/s
Age	184 Myr

Other designations
- ο Peg, 43 Pegasi, BD+28°4436, HD 214994, HIP 112051, HR 8641, SAO 90717

Database references
SIMBAD	data

ο Pegasi, Latinized as Omicron Pegasi, is a suspected astrometric binary star system in the northern constellation of Pegasus. It is white in hue and visible to the naked eye as a faint point of light with an apparent visual magnitude of +4.80. The distance to this system is approximately 290 light years based on parallax, and it is drifting further away from the Sun with a radial velocity of +8.5 km/s.

The visible component has a stellar classification of A1 IV, matching a subgiant star that has begun to cool, expand and brighten off the main sequence. It has very narrow lines due to a low projected rotational velocity of 6 km/s. The abundances of iron are Sun-like, while it displays an overabundance of heavier elements. Some studies have suggested it is an Am-like star. Omicron Pegasi is an estimated 184 million years old with 2.24 times the mass of the Sun. It is radiating 85 times the Sun's luminosity from its photosphere at an effective temperature of 9,600 K.
