= Lambda Pegasi =

Fourth-magnitude star in the constellation Pegasus

λ Pegasi
- Location of λ Pegasi (circled)

Observation data Epoch J2000 Equinox ICRS
- Constellation: Pegasus
- Right ascension: 22^{h} 46^{m} 31.87786^{s}
- Declination: +23° 33′ 56.3561″
- Apparent magnitude (V): 3.93

Characteristics
- Spectral type: G8II-III
- U−B color index: +0.93
- B−V color index: +1.07

Astrometry
Radial velocity (R_{v})	-4.15 km/s
Proper motion (μ)	RA: 55.75 mas/yr Dec.: -10.15 mas/yr
Parallax (π)	8.93±0.24 mas
Distance	365 ± 10 ly (112 ± 3 pc)
Absolute magnitude (M_{V})	-1.45

Details
Mass	3.944±0.152 M_{☉}
Radius	28.254±1.633 R_{☉}
Luminosity	397±30 L_{☉}
Surface gravity (log g)	2.12±0.08 cgs
Temperature	4,848±109 K
Metallicity [Fe/H]	−0.07±0.06 dex
Rotational velocity (v sin i)	8.0 km/s

Other designations
- Ligong, λ Peg, 47 Peg, BD+22°4709, FK5 859, GC 31776, GJ 4295, HD 215665, HIP 112440, HR 8667, SAO 90775, IRAS 22441+2318

Database references
SIMBAD	data

Lambda Pegasi, also named Ligong, is a fourth-magnitude star in the constellation Pegasus. It lies near Mu Pegasi, to the southwest of the brighter Beta Pegasi (Scheat).

== Nomenclature ==
Lambda Pegasi (Latinized from λ Pegasi, abbreviated λ Peg) is the star's Bayer designation. It traditionally shared the Arabic name Sadalbari with Mu Pegasi.

In Chinese astronomy, this star is part of the constellation Ligong (離宮), representing a secondary or temporary palace. The IAU Working Group on Star Names adopted the name Ligong for this star on 13 August 2026, after this Chinese constellation.

== Properties ==
λ Pegasi is a yellow giant with stellar classification G8II-III. With a mass of 1.5 M_{☉} and radius that is 28.5 R_{☉}, the star boasts a bolometric luminosity that is roughly 390 L_{☉}. Its apparent magnitude was calibrated in 1983 at 3.96, yielding an absolute magnitude of -1.45. Parallax calculations place the star at a distance of roughly 112 parsecs from Earth, or 365 ± 10 light years away, about three times the distance of its line-of-sight double μ Pegasi.
