= 9 Pegasi =

Star in the constellation Pegasus

- Location of 9 Peg (circled)

Observation data Epoch J2000 Equinox ICRS
- Constellation: Pegasus
- Right ascension: 21^{h} 44^{m} 30.69581^{s}
- Declination: +17° 21′ 00.0571″
- Apparent magnitude (V): 4.35

Characteristics
- Spectral type: G5Ib
- U−B color index: +0.96
- B−V color index: +1.17

Astrometry
Radial velocity (R_{v})	−23.11 km/s
Proper motion (μ)	RA: 8.66 mas/yr Dec.: −11.33 mas/yr
Parallax (π)	3.52±0.22 mas
Distance	900 ly (276 pc)
Absolute magnitude (M_{V})	~−3

Details
Mass	7.1 M_{☉}
Radius	61 R_{☉}
Luminosity	1,950 L_{☉}
Surface gravity (log g)	1.58 cgs
Temperature	4,910 K
Metallicity [Fe/H]	−0.04 dex
Rotational velocity (v sin i)	10 km/s

Other designations
- 9 Peg, HR 8313, BD+16°4582, HD 206859, SAO 107365, HIP 107348

Database references
SIMBAD	data

9 Pegasi (9 Peg) is a supergiant star in the constellation Pegasus. Its apparent magnitude is 4.35.

9 Pegasi is defined and used as an MK standard star for the spectral type G5 Ib. It is a yellow supergiant nearly two thousand times more luminous than the sun and sixty times larger. It has been reported to be slightly variable and is listed in the New Catalogue of Suspected Variable Stars with a magnitude range of 4.20 to 4.35.

9 Pegasi does not have a Bayer designation although it is brighter than several stars in Pegasus that do such as τ, φ, and σ Pegasi, because it was included in the constellation Battery of Volta, along with 1 Pegasi. It is the 9th star numbered by Flamsteed in order of right ascension. In the 1795 French-language Fortin-Flamsteed edition of the Atlas Coelestis, 9 Pegasi is labelled with the letter "g".
