= Flamsteed (disambiguation) =

Flamsteed may refer to:

- John Flamsteed (1646–1719), English astronomer, first Astronomer Royal
- Associated with John Flamsteed:
  - Margaret Flamsteed, English astronomer (wife of and assistant to John)
  - Flamsteed designation, identifier for stars
  - Flamsteed (crater), on the Moon

== See also ==
- Flamstead, a village in England
