= 1 Pegasi =

Triple star system in the constellation Pegasus

- Location of 1 Pegasi (circled)

Observation data Epoch J2000 Equinox ICRS
- Constellation: Pegasus
- Right ascension: 21^{h} 22^{m} 05.19950^{s}
- Declination: 19° 48′ 16.2375″
- Apparent magnitude (V): 4.09

Characteristics
- Spectral type: K1III
- U−B color index: +1.05
- B−V color index: +1.11

Astrometry
| Radial velocity (R_{v}) | −10.80 km/s |
| Proper motion (μ) | RA: +105.391 mas/yr Dec.: +62.841 mas/yr |
| Parallax (π) | 20.8482±0.1452 mas |
| Distance | 156 ± 1 ly (48.0 ± 0.3 pc) |
| Absolute magnitude (M_{V}) | +0.68 |

Details

1 Peg A
| Mass | 1.60±0.18 M_{☉} |
| Radius | 11.89±0.15 R_{☉} |
| Luminosity | 63.5±0.3 L_{☉} |
| Surface gravity (log g) | 2.59 cgs |
| Temperature | 4,725±64 K |
| Metallicity [Fe/H] | +0.01 dex |
| Rotational velocity (v sin i) | 1.2 km/s |
| Age | 2.04±0.54 Gyr |

Other designations
- 1 Peg, BD+19°4691, FK5 804, GC 29914, HD 203504, HIP 105502, HR 8173, SAO 107073, CCDM J21221+1949A, WDS J21221+1948A

Database references
| SIMBAD | data |

1 Pegasi (1 Peg) is a triple star system in the constellation Pegasus, located approximately 156 light years away from the Sun based on parallax. It is visible to the naked eye as a faint, orange-hued star with an apparent visual magnitude of 4.09. The system is moving closer to the Earth with a heliocentric radial velocity of −11 km/s.

The primary component is a giant with a stellar classification of K1III, a star that has exhausted the hydrogen supply at its core and evolved away from the main sequence. Estimated to be two billion years old, 1 Pegasi has 1.6 times the mass of the Sun and has expanded to twelve times the Sun's radius. The star is radiating 64 times the Sun's luminosity from its enlarged photosphere at an effective temperature of 4,725 K.

There are several companions in addition to the primary. The brightest, component B, is a magnitude 9.3, K-type main-sequence star with a class of K0 V orbiting at an angular separation of 36.6" from the primary; it is itself a single-lined spectroscopic binary with an orbital period of 3.042 ± 0.011 years and eccentricity of 0.290±0.022. Visual companions C, with magnitude 12.9 and separation 64.7", and D, with magnitude 9.6 and separation 5.3", have been reported.

1 Pegasi is the brightest star in Pegasus that does not have a Bayer designation, although it is brighter than several stars in Pegasus that do such as τ, φ, and σ Pegasi, perhaps because it was included as the brightest star in the constellation Battery of Volta, made by Thomas Young. It is the first star numbered by Flamsteed in order of right ascension. In the 1795 French-language Fortin-Flamsteed edition of the Atlas Coelestis, 1 Pegasi is labelled with the letter "e".
