= Joseph Crosthwait =

British astronomer

- Born: 1681; England
- Scientific career
- Fields: Astronomy
- Institutions: The Royal Observatory, Greenwich

Joseph Crosthwait was chief assistant to John Flamsteed, the first Astronomer Royal.

Originally from Cumberland, Crosthwait came to the Observatory in 1708 and remained there until Flamsteed's death in 1719. Along with Flamsteed's widow, Margaret, and Abraham Sharp, he finalised publication of Flamsteed's Historia Coelestis Britannica and Atlas Coelestis.
