= Coelestis =

Coelestis from the Latin coelestis meaning celestial may refer to:

- Coelestis, a junior synonym of the moth genus Zygaena
- Coelestis, an alternative spelling of the Roman goddess Caelestis
- Coelestis, a 1993 science fiction novel by Paul Park
- Coelestis Pastor, a 1689 papal encyclical condemning quietism
- Atlas Coelestis, a 1729 star atlas by John Flamsteed
