= Scheele (crater) =

Crater on the Moon

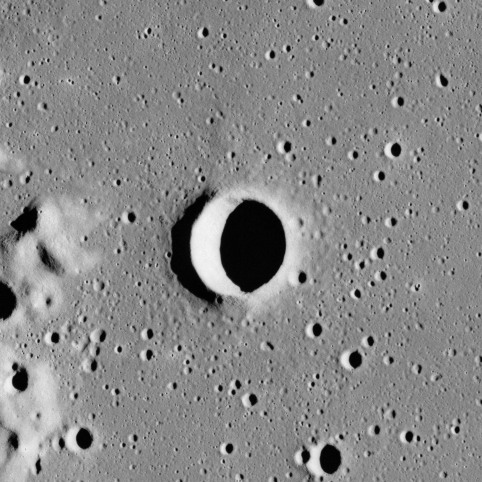
- Apollo 16 Mapping camera image
- Coordinates: 9.4°S 37.8°W
- Diameter: 4 km
- Depth: 0.8 km
- Colongitude: 38° at sunrise
- Eponym: Carl W. Scheele

Scheele is a tiny, bowl-shaped lunar impact crater that lies on the Oceanus Procellarum, to the south of the small crater Wichmann. To the southwest is the flooded crater Letronne. To the southwest of Scheele are several low ridges projecting above the surface of the lunar mare, the Dorsa Ewing.

This crater was named after the Swedish chemist Carl Wilhelm Scheele. It was previously designated Letronne D.
