= Surveyor 1 =

Lunar lander spacecraft

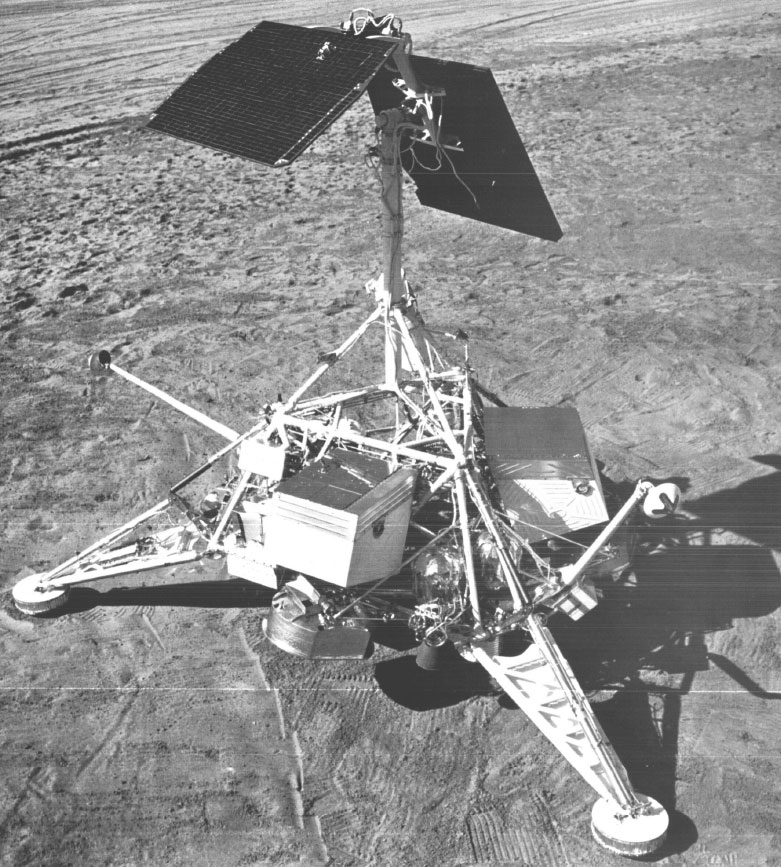
- Surveyor model on Earth
- Mission type: Lunar lander
- Operator: NASA
- COSPAR ID: 1966-045A
- SATCAT no.: 02185
- Mission duration: 7 months, 8 days (launch to last contact)

Spacecraft properties
- Manufacturer: Hughes Aircraft
- Launch mass: 995.2 kilograms (2,194 lb)
- Landing mass: 292 kilograms (644 lb)

Start of mission
- Launch date: May 30, 1966, 14:41:01 UTC
- Rocket: Atlas LV-3C Centaur-D AC-10
- Launch site: Cape Canaveral LC-36A

End of mission
- Last contact: 7 January 1967

Lunar lander
- Landing date: June 2, 1966, 06:17:36 UTC
- Landing site: 2.474°S 43.339°W

Surveyor 1 was the first lunar soft-lander in the uncrewed Surveyor program of the National Aeronautics and Space Administration (NASA, United States). This lunar soft-lander gathered data about the lunar surface that would be needed for the crewed Apollo Moon landings that began in 1969. The successful soft landing of Surveyor 1 on the Ocean of Storms was the first by an American space probe on any extraterrestrial body, occurring four months after the first soft Moon landing by the Soviet Union's Luna 9 probe.

Surveyor 1 was launched May 30, 1966, from the Cape Canaveral Air Force Station at Cape Canaveral, Florida, and it landed on the Moon on June 2, 1966. Surveyor 1 transmitted 11,237 still photos of the lunar surface to the Earth by using a television camera and a sophisticated radio-telemetry system.

The Surveyor program was managed by the Jet Propulsion Laboratory, in Los Angeles County, California, and the Surveyor space probe was built by the Hughes Aircraft Company in El Segundo, California.

== Mission description ==
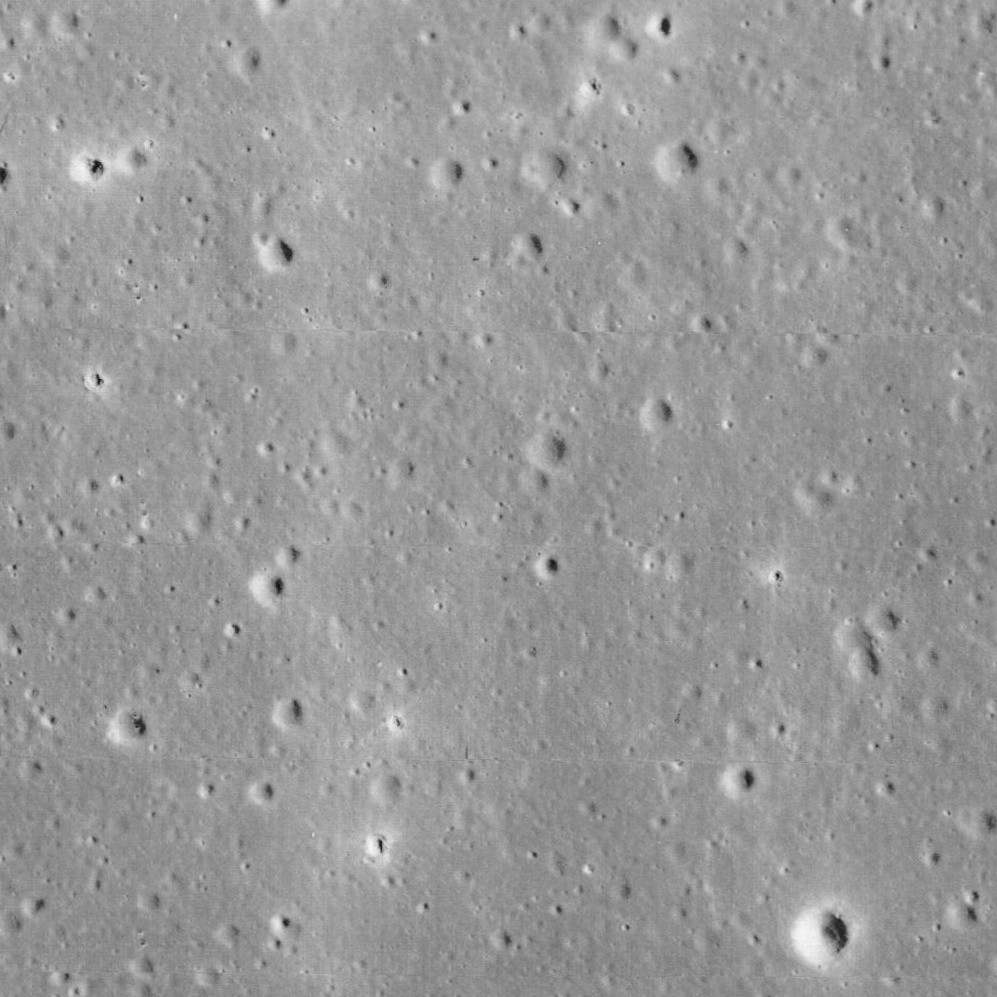
Lunar surface centered on the landing site, photographed by Lunar Orbiter 1 in 1966. View is 7 km wide.

The Surveyor series of space probes were intended to carry out the first soft landings on the Moon by any spacecraft. Data was collected by its television camera and returned to Earth via the Deep Space Network from 1966 to 1967. These spacecraft carried two television cameras — one for its approach, which was not used in this case, and one for taking still pictures of the lunar surface. Over 100 engineering sensors were on board each Surveyor. Their television systems transmitted pictures of the spacecraft footpad and surrounding lunar terrain and surface materials. These spacecraft also acquired data on the radar reflectivity of the lunar surface, the load-bearing strength of the lunar surface, and the temperatures for use in the analysis of the lunar surface temperatures. (Later Surveyor space probes, beginning with Surveyor 3, carried scientific instruments to measure the composition and mechanical properties of the lunar "soil".)

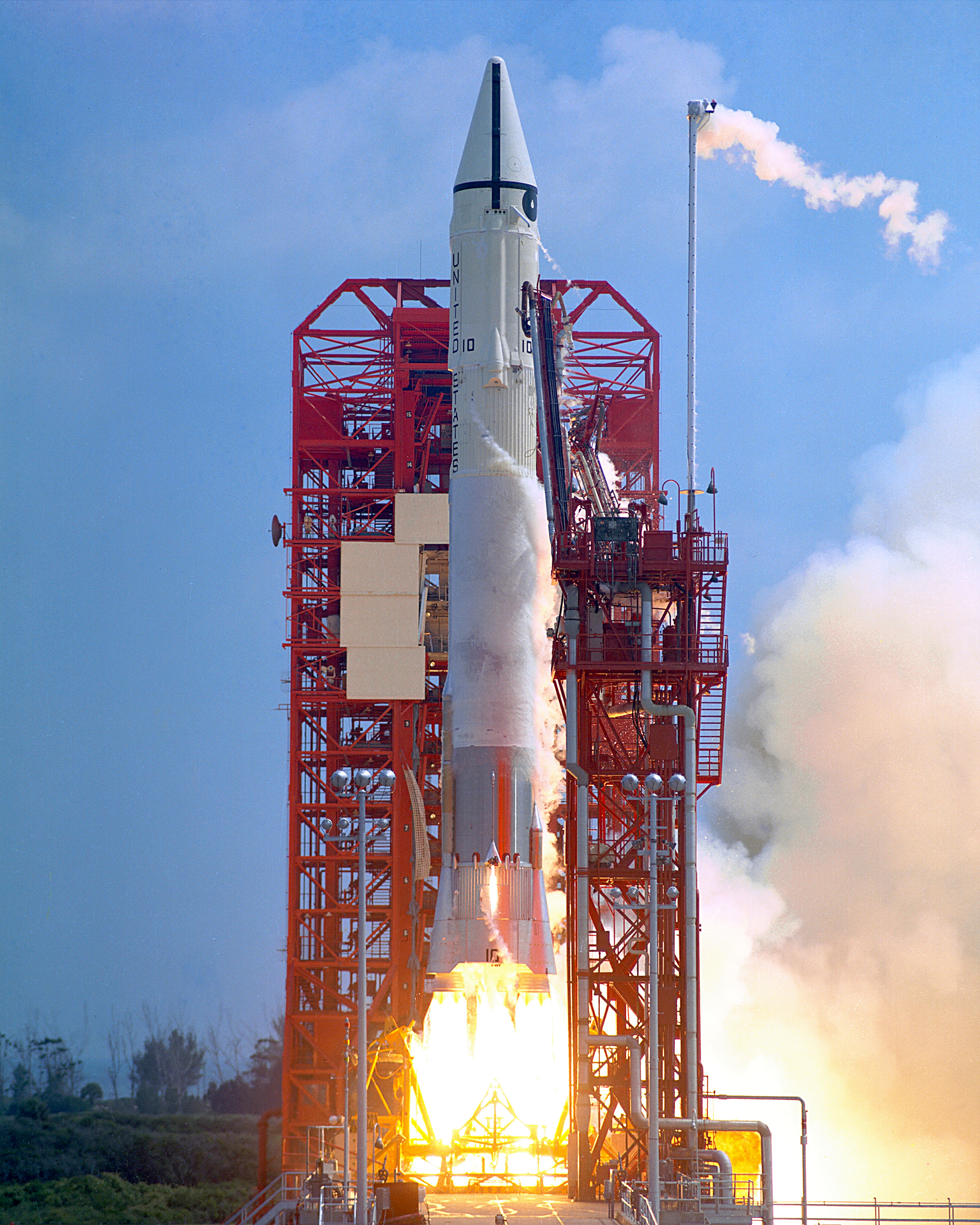
Launch of the Atlas-Centaur rocket carrying the Surveyor 1 space probe

Surveyor 1 was launched May 30, 1966 and sent directly into a trajectory to the Moon without any parking orbit. Its retrorockets were turned off at a height of about 3.4 meters above the lunar surface. Surveyor 1 fell freely to the surface from this height, and it landed on the lunar surface on June 2, 1966, on the Oceanus Procellarum. This location was at 2.474°S 43.339°W. This is within the northeast portion of the large crater called Flamsteed P (or the Flamsteed Ring). Flamsteed itself lies within Flamsteed P on the south side.

The duration of the spaceflight of Surveyor 1 was about 63 hours, 30 minutes. Surveyor 1's lunar launch weight was about 995.2 kilograms (2,194 lb), and its landing weight (minus expended maneuvering propellant, its solid-fueled retrorocket (which had been jettisoned), and its radar altimeter system) was about 294.3 kilograms (649 lb).

Surveyor 1 transmitted video data from the Moon beginning shortly after its landing through July 14, 1966, but with a period of no operations during the two-week long lunar night of June 14, 1966 through July 7, 1966. Because the Moon always presents the same face to Earth, "line-of-sight" radio communications with Surveyor 1 required only changes in ground stations as the Earth rotated. However, since it was solar-powered, Surveyor 1 had no electricity with which to function during the two weeks of the lunar night.

The return of engineering information (temperatures, etc.) from Surveyor 1 continued through January 7, 1967, with several interruptions during the lunar nights.

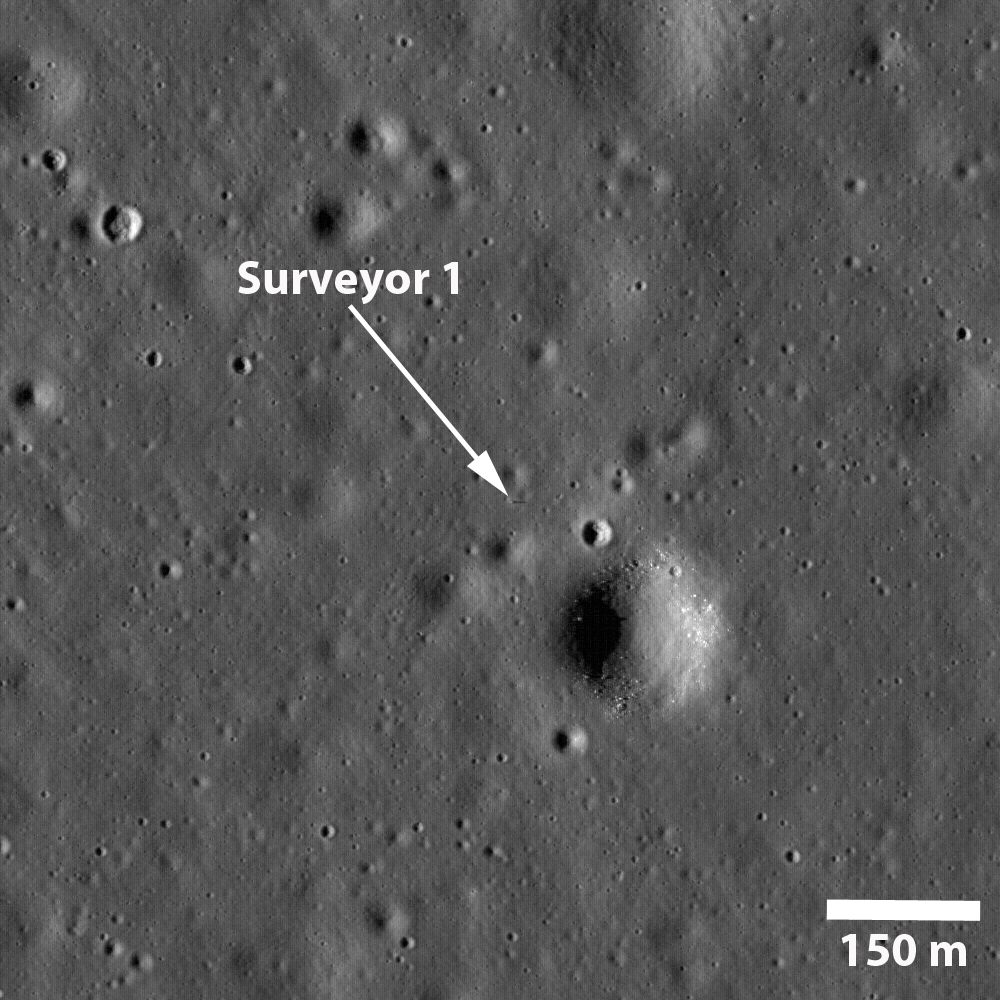
Surveyor 1 photographed by the Lunar Reconnaissance Orbiter in 2009

The landing of Surveyor 1 was carried live on some television networks, and the success of the first Surveyor landing was considered surprising, especially after the failure of a number of the Ranger spacecraft en route to the Moon. Justin Rennilson, formerly of Jet Propulsion Laboratory, stated, "We figured the probability of success at around 10 to 15 percent." Among hundreds of other challenges, an uninterrupted communication link for navigation and control was critical to success.

== Science instruments ==
=== Television ===
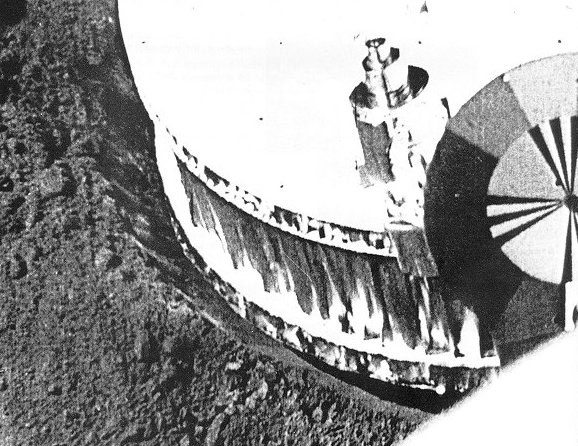
Image from Surveyor 1 of its footpad in order to study soil mechanics in preparation for the Apollo crewed landings.

The TV camera consisted of a vidicon tube, a zoom lens operated at either end of its range resulting in 25 millimeter and 100 millimeter focal-lengths, resulting in optical fields of view of 25.3 or 6.43 degrees, a shutter, clear, orange, green and blue optical filters, and iris-system mounted along an axis inclined approximately 16 degrees from the central axis of Surveyor 1. The camera was mounted under a mirror that could be moved in azimuth and elevation. The rotation of the mirror in the azimuth direction, while providing azimuth coverage capability results in an image rotation proportional to the angular azimuth position of the mirror. This is because the image plane and scanning raster of the vidicon are stationary with respect to the mirror azimuth axis. The mirror drive mechanism consisting of stepper motors provided a step size of 2.48° ±0.1° in elevation and 3.0° ±0.1° in azimuth. This calibrated stepping reference allowed the creation of large composite mosaics of the lunar surface and using the data read-back from the iris and focus positioning of the lens permitted some photogrammetric measurements of various lunar features. The TV camera's operation was dependent on the receipt of the proper radio commands from the Earth. Frame-by-frame coverage of the lunar surface was obtained over 360 degrees in azimuth and from +40 degrees above the plane normal to the camera's axis to -65 degrees below this plane. Both 600-line and 200-line modes of operation were used. The 200-line mode transmitted over an omnidirectional antenna for the first 14 photos and scanned one frame every 61.8 seconds. The remaining transmissions were of 600-line pictures over a directional antenna, and each frame was scanned every 3.6 seconds. Each 200-line picture required 20 seconds for a complete video transmission and it used a radio bandwidth of about 1.2 kilohertz.

Each 600 line picture required about one second to be read from the vidicon tube, and they required a radio bandwidth of about 220 kilohertz. The data transmissions were converted into a standard TV signal for both closed-circuit TV and broadcast TV. The television images were displayed on Earth on a slow-scan monitor coated with a long persistency phosphor. The persistency was selected to optimally match the nominal maximum frame rate. One frame of TV identification was received for each incoming TV frame, and it was displayed in real time at a rate compatible with the incoming image. These data were recorded on a video magnetic tape recorder. Over 10,000 pictures were taken by Surveyor 1's TV camera before the lunar sunset of June 14, 1966. Included in these pictures were wide-angle and narrow-angle panoramas, focus ranging surveys, photometric surveys, special area surveys, and celestial photography. Surveyor 1 responded to commands to activate the camera on July 7, and by July 14, 1966, it had returned nearly 1000 more pictures.

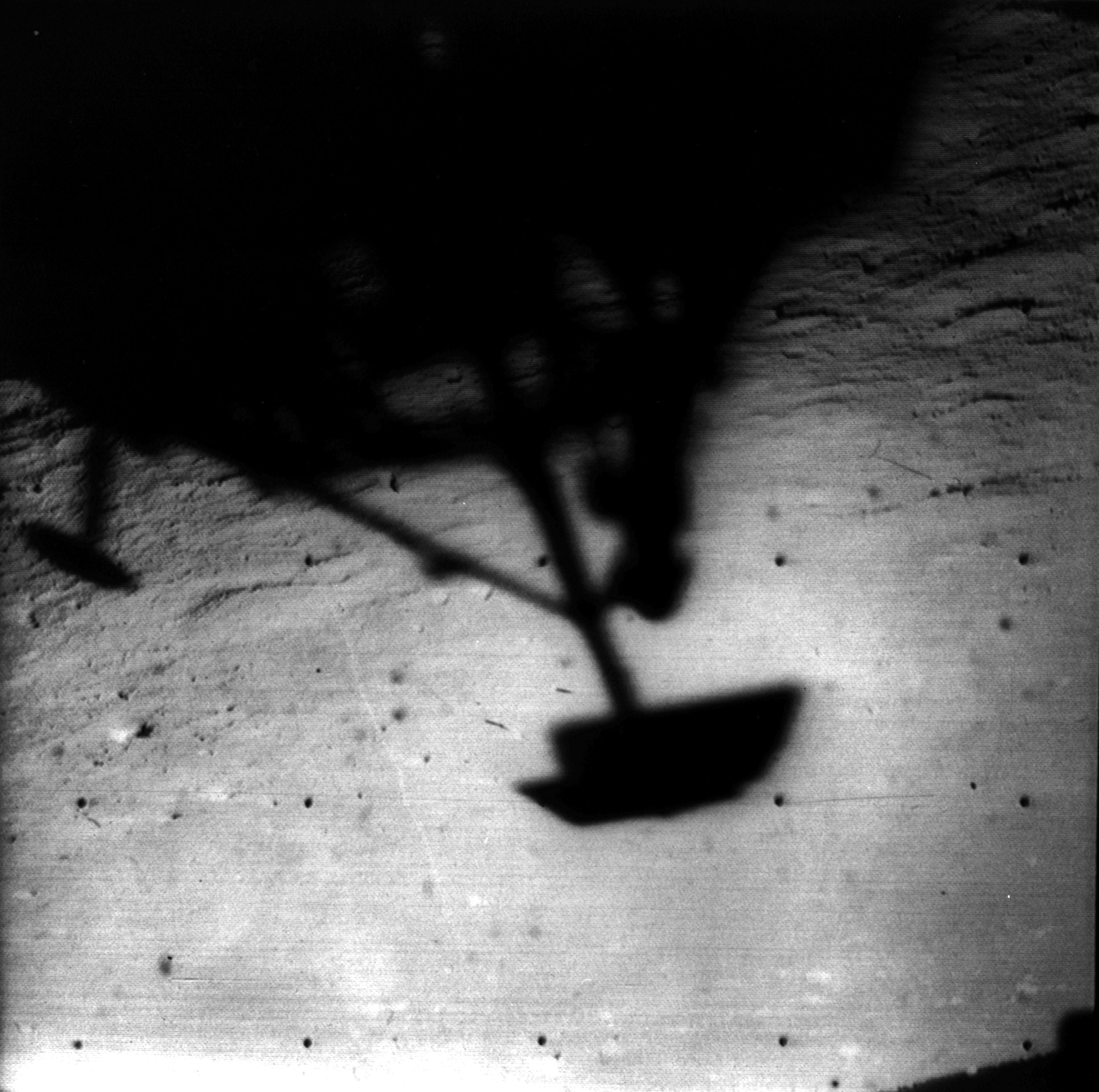
Surveyor 1's shadow against the lunar surface (upside-down image)

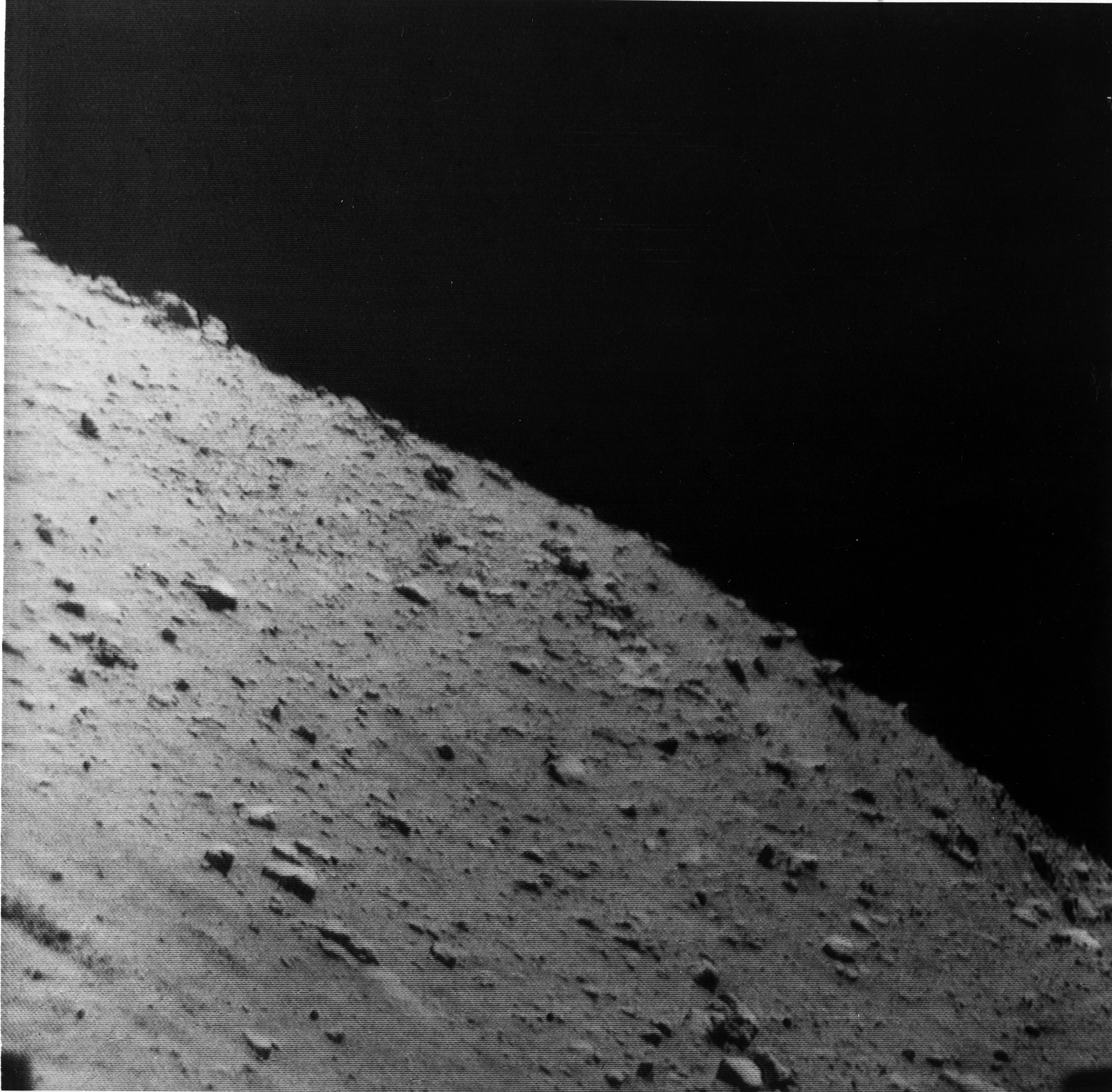
The mare surface

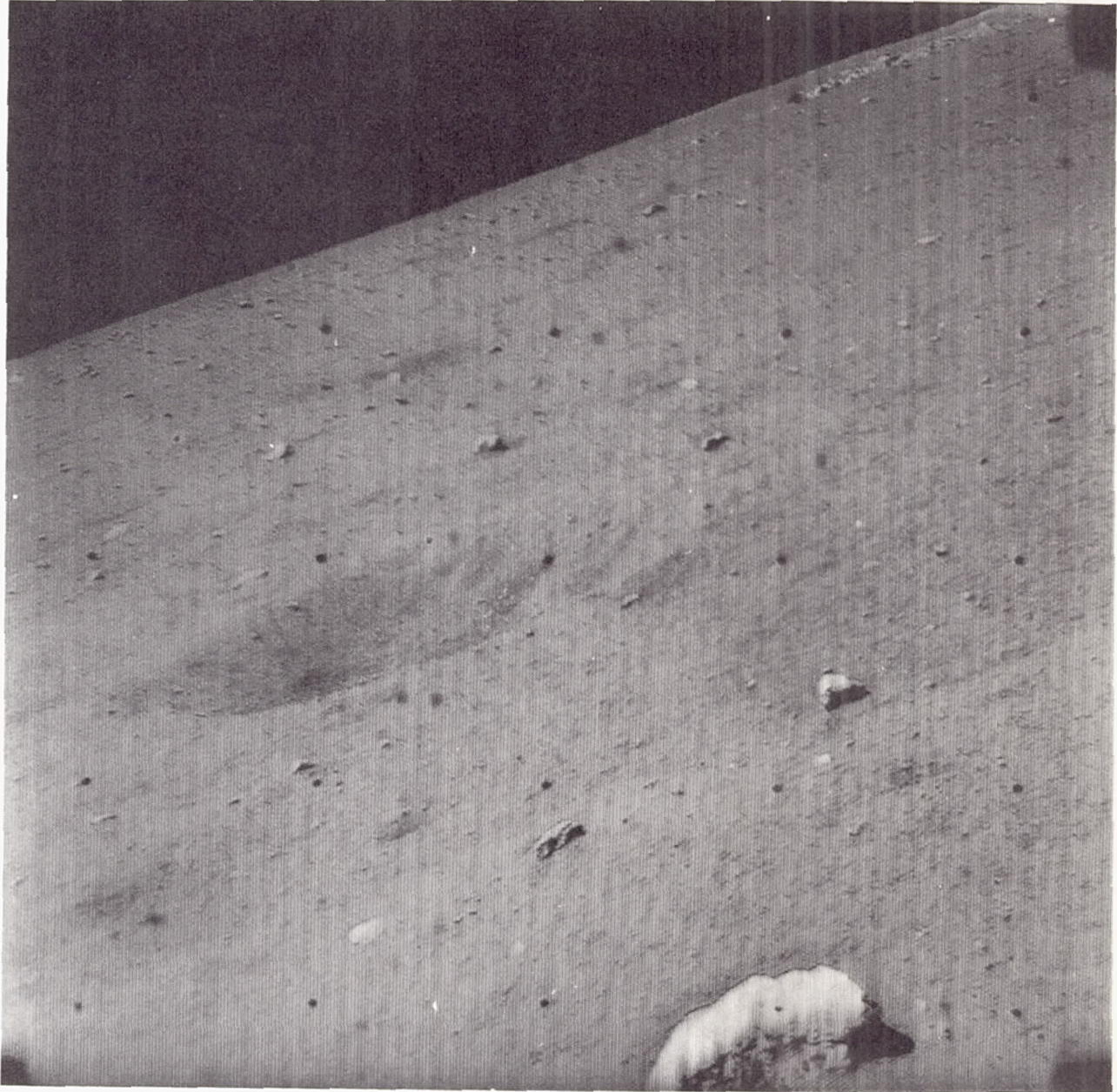
Another view of the mare surface

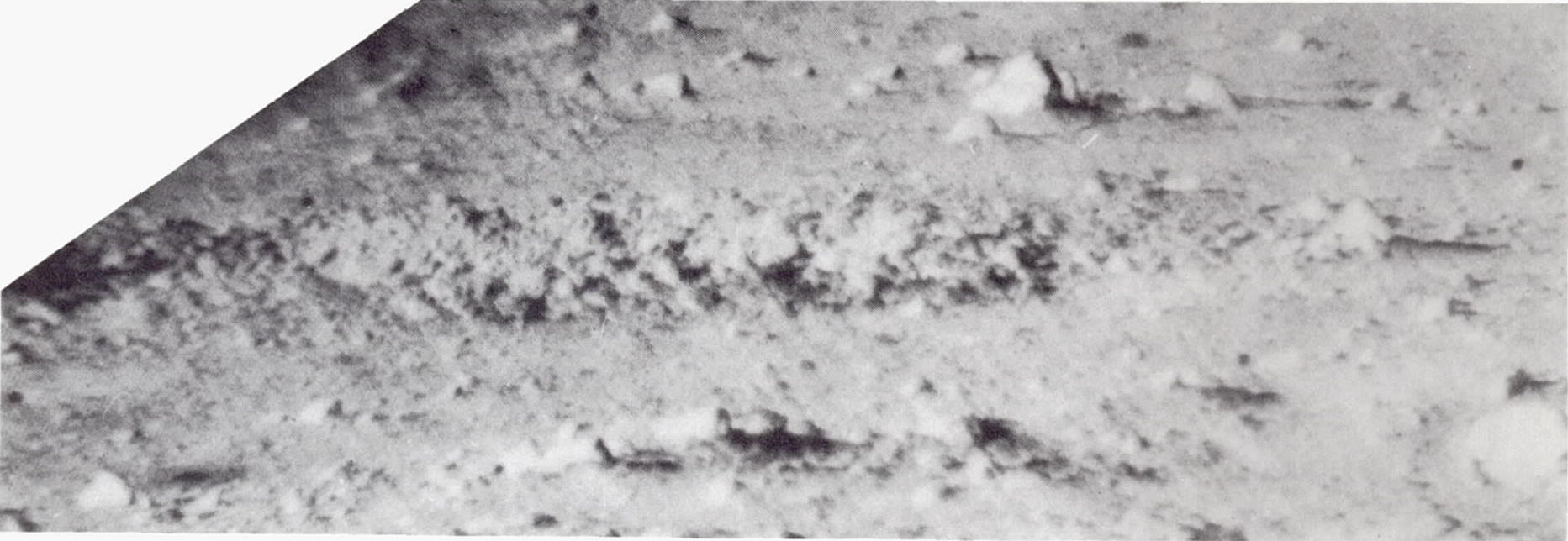
Irregularly shaped crater at the landing site

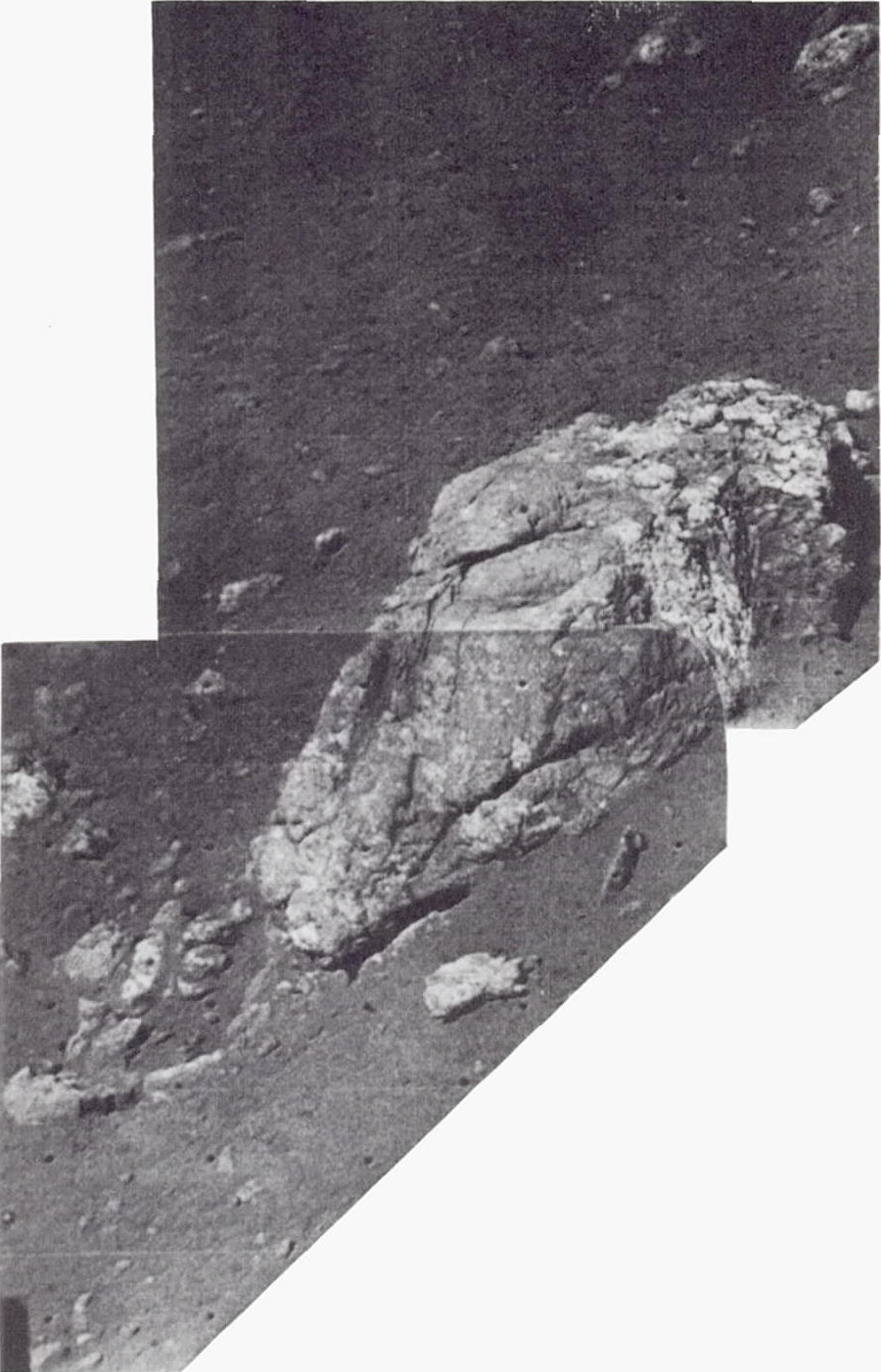
Mottled rock about 50 cm long near Surveyor 1

=== Strain gauge ===
Strain gauges were mounted on each leg shock absorber to record the peak axial forces at landing impact of the spacecraft. They were designed to accept a force of approximately 800 kgf (7.8 kN).

== Legacy and status ==
On January 6, 1967, Surveyor 1 was reactivated for 12 hours. The spacecraft returned data on the motion of the Moon, which would be used to refine the map of its orbital path around the Earth as well as better determine the distance between the two worlds.

== See also ==
- List of artificial objects on the Moon
- List of missions to the Moon
