= Letronne (crater) =

Crater on the Moon

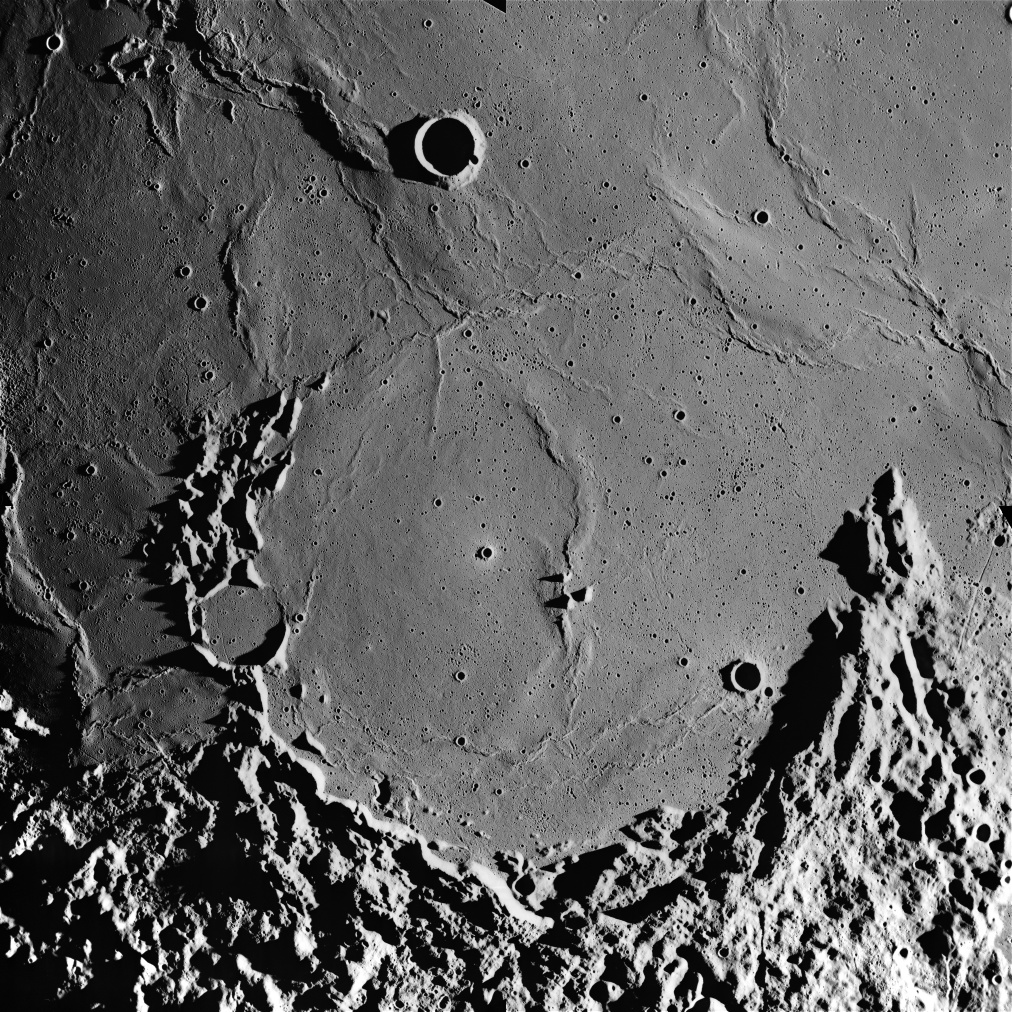
- Letronne from Apollo 16. NASA photo.
- Coordinates: 10.6°S 42.4°W
- Diameter: 120 km
- Depth: 1.0 km
- Colongitude: 42° at sunrise
- Formation: Lower Imbrian
- Eponym: Jean-Antoine Letronne

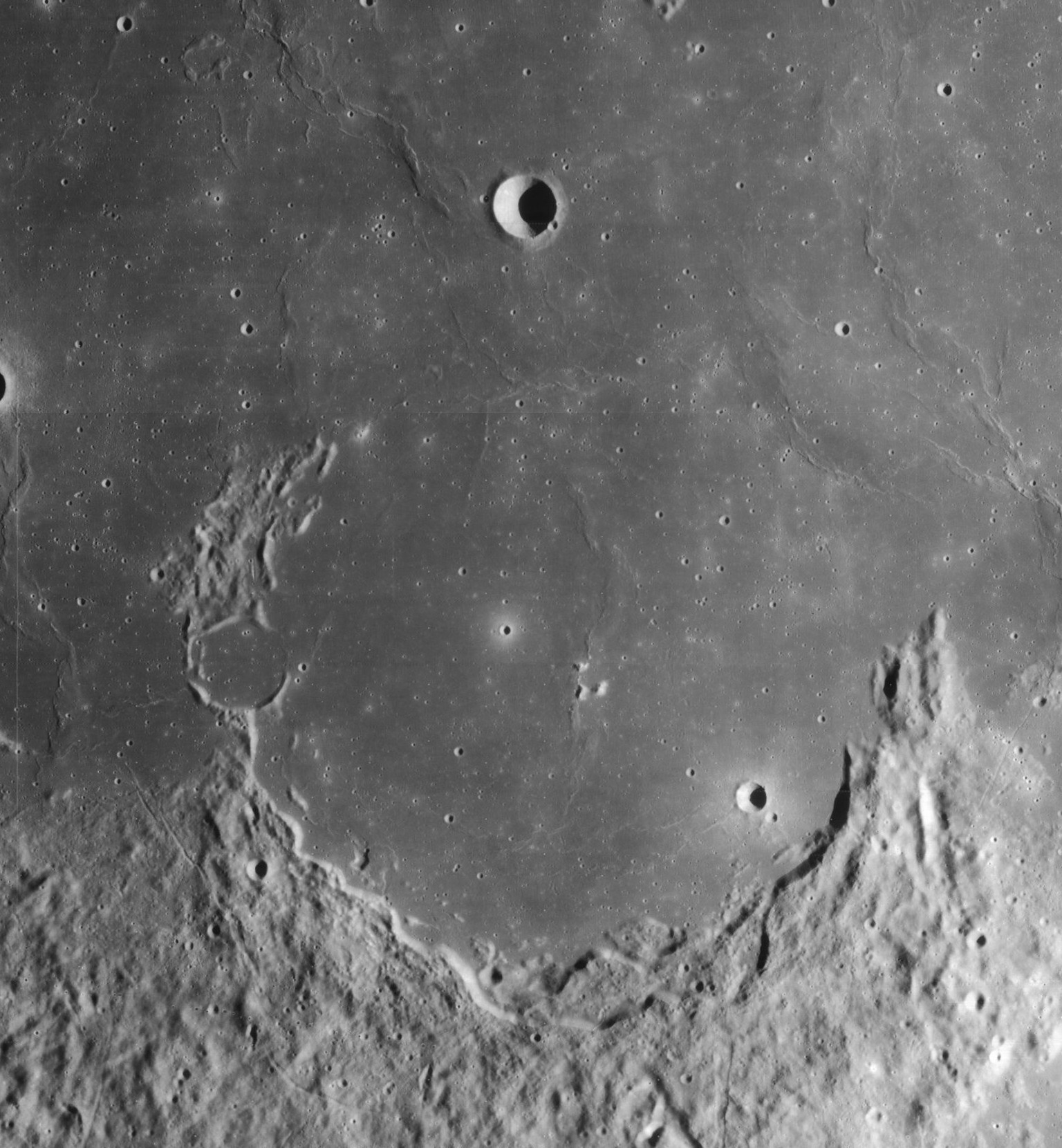
Lunar Orbiter 4 image of Letronne. Note higher sun angle than the Apollo 16 image above.

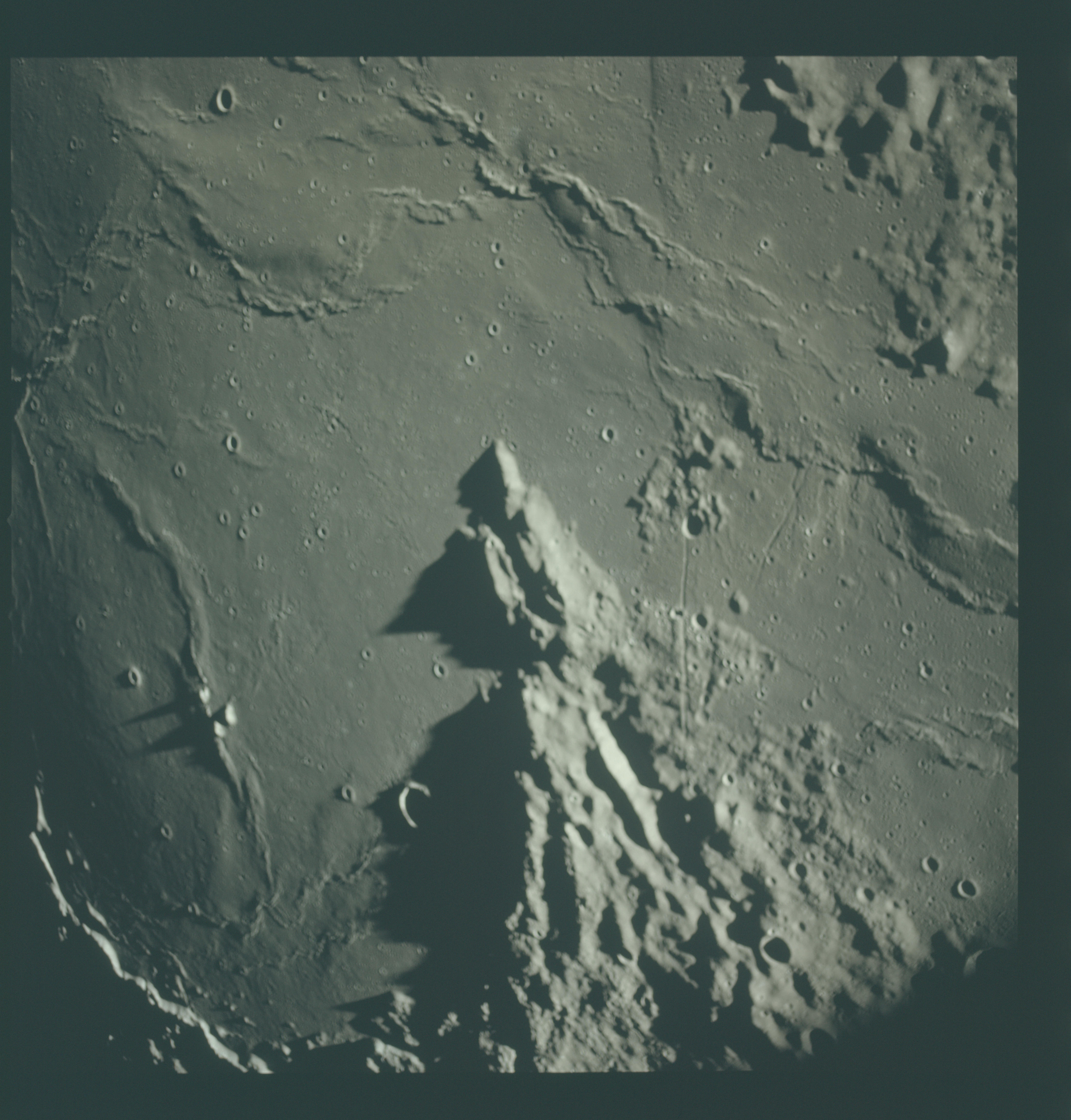
Another view of eastern Letronne, from Apollo 16

Letronne is the lava-flooded remnant of a lunar impact crater. It was named after French archaeologist Jean-Antoine Letronne. The northern part of the rim is completely missing, and opens into the Oceanus Procellarum, forming a bay along the southwestern shore. The formation is located to the northwest of the large crater Gassendi.To the west-southwest is the flooded crater Billy, and north-northwest lies the smaller Flamsteed.

The surviving rim of Letronne is now little more than a semi-circular series of ridges. The flooded, broken rim of Winthrop overlies the western wall. The rim is the most intact along the eastern stretch, forming a mountainous promontory into the mare. A small cluster of central rises lie at the midpoint of the crater. The wrinkle ridge Dorsa Rubey traverses the floor from north to south, and outlines a portion of the missing rim. The crater floor is otherwise nearly smooth and relatively free of craterlets, with the exception of Letronne B near the southeast rim.

Letronne is one of the largest craters of Lower (Early) Imbrian age.

== Satellite craters ==
By convention these features are identified on lunar maps by placing the letter on the side of the crater midpoint that is closest to Letronne.

| Letronne | Latitude | Longitude | Diameter |
|---|---|---|---|
| A | 12.1° S | 39.1° W | 7 km |
| B | 11.2° S | 41.2° W | 5 km |
| C | 10.7° S | 38.5° W | 4 km |
| F | 9.2° S | 46.1° W | 8 km |
| G | 12.7° S | 46.5° W | 10 km |
| H | 12.6° S | 46.0° W | 4 km |
| K | 14.5° S | 43.6° W | 5 km |
| L | 14.3° S | 44.3° W | 5 km |
| M | 12.0° S | 44.1° W | 3 km |
| N | 12.3° S | 39.8° W | 4 km |
| T | 12.5° S | 42.6° W | 3 km |

The following craters have been renamed by the IAU.

- Letronne D — See Scheele.
- Letronne P — See Winthrop.
