= Winthrop (crater) =

Crater on the Moon

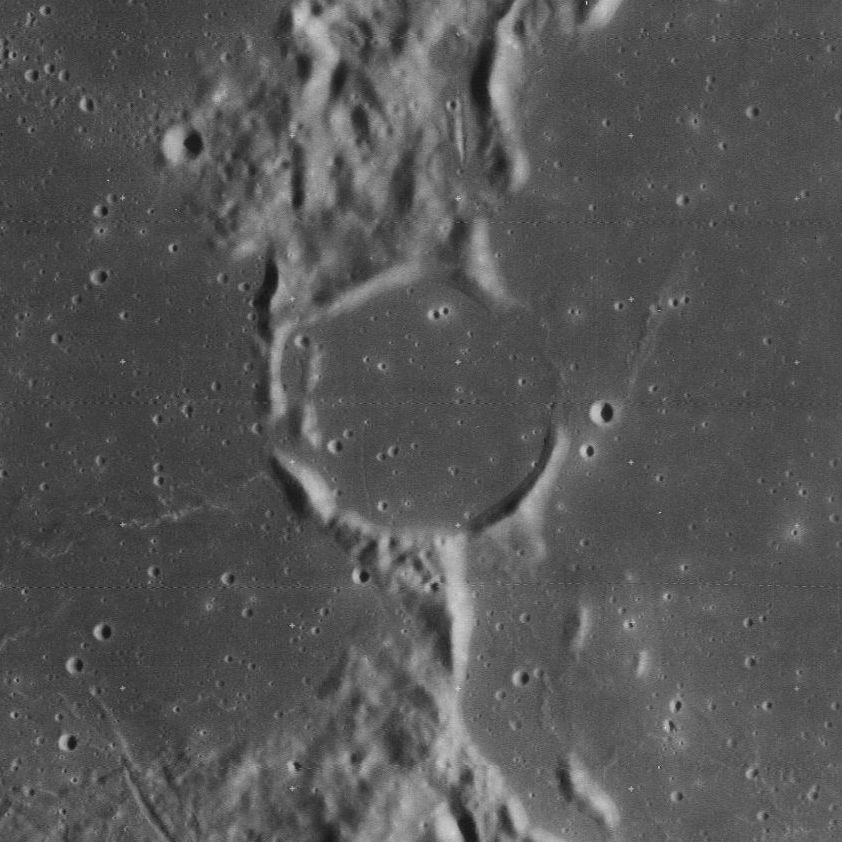
- Lunar Orbiter 4 image
- Coordinates: 10.7°S 44.4°W
- Diameter: 18 km
- Colongitude: 45° at sunrise
- Eponym: John Winthrop

Winthrop is the remnant of a lunar impact crater that has been flooded by lava from the Oceanus Procellarum. It was named after American astronomer John Winthrop. It lies across the western rim of the much larger crater Letronne, a feature that has been nearly destroyed by the intruding mare lavas. All that survives of Winthrop are a few segments of the outer rim.

Winthrop was previously identified as Letronne P before being renamed by the IAU in 1976.
