= Flamsteed (crater) =

Crater on the Moon

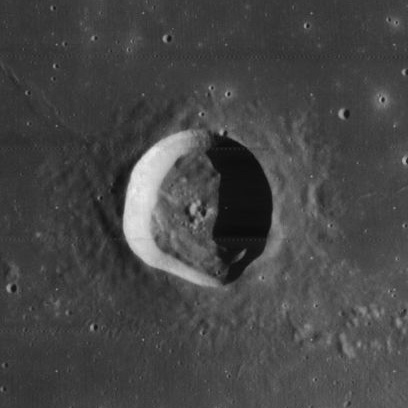
- Lunar Orbiter 4 image
- Coordinates: 4.5°S 44.3°W
- Diameter: 19.34 km (12.02 mi)
- Depth: 2.16 km (1.34 mi)
- Colongitude: 44° at sunrise
- Formation: Eratosthenian
- Eponym: John Flamsteed

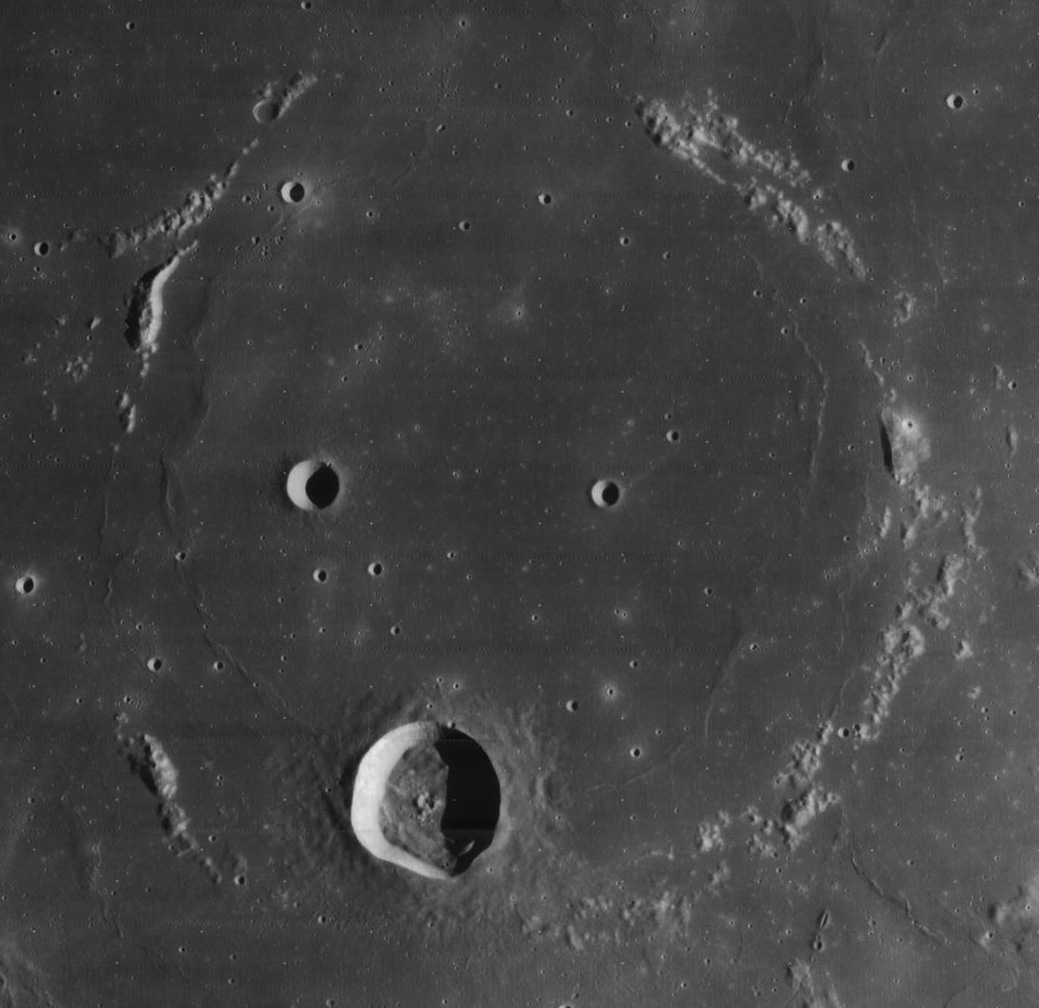
Flamsteed P (ring of hills), from Lunar Orbiter 4

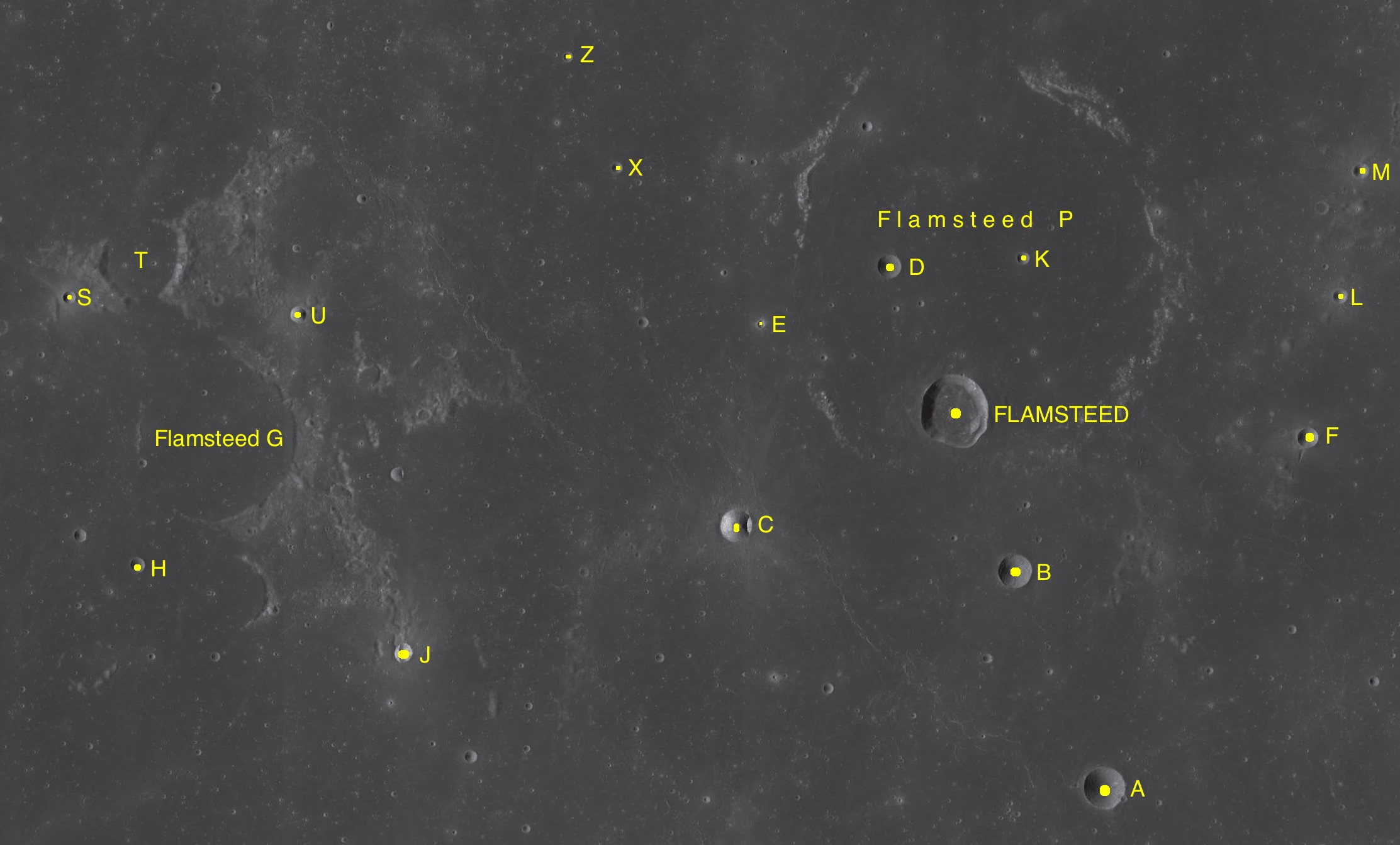
Flamsteed satellite features and surroundings

Flamsteed is a small lunar impact crater located on the Oceanus Procellarum. It lies almost due east of the dark-hued Grimaldi, and north-northwest of the flooded Letronne bay on the south edge of the mare. T. W. Webb called this "a crater combined with a circle of banks" that "looks like an overflowed ring".

On the lunar geologic timescale, Flamsteed is a crater of Eratosthenian age. Its low rim is nearly circular in form, with an outward bulge to the southeast. The interior is relatively flat and undistinguished by impacts with some low rises near the midpoint. The crater lies within the southern rim of a crater that has been almost completely submerged by the basaltic lava flows that formed the Oceanus Procellarum. Designated Flamsteed P, all that remains of this feature are some low ridges and hills arranged in a circular formation. It is sometimes referred to as the Flamsteed ring.

This crater is named after British astronomer John Flamsteed (1646-1719). His name was incorporated into lunar nomenclature by German astronomer Johann H. Mädler in 1837. Its designation was officially adopted by the International Astronomical Union in 1935.

The Surveyor 1 craft landed within the northeast rim of the buried Flamsteed P feature, about 50 kilometers north-northeast of the Flamsteed crater rim.

== Satellite craters ==
By convention these features are identified on lunar maps by placing the letter on the side of the crater midpoint that is closest to Flamsteed.

Flamsteed	Latitude	Longitude	Diameter
A	7.9° S	42.9° W	11 km
B	5.9° S	43.7° W	10 km
C	5.5° S	46.3° W	9 km
D	3.2° S	44.9° W	6 km
E	3.7° S	46.1° W	2 km
F	4.7° S	41.1° W	5 km
G	4.8° S	50.9° W	46 km
H	5.9° S	51.7° W	4 km
J	6.6° S	49.3° W	5 km
K	3.1° S	43.7° W	4 km
L	3.4° S	40.9° W	4 km
M	2.4° S	40.6° W	4 km
P	3.2° S	44.1° W	112 km
S	3.4° S	52.2° W	4 km
T	3.1° S	51.6° W	24 km
U	3.6° S	50.2° W	4 km
X	2.3° S	47.3° W	3 km
Z	1.3° S	47.8° W	3 km
