= Sigma Pegasi =

Star in the constellation Pegasus

- Location of σ Pegasi (circled in red)

Observation data Epoch J2000.0 Equinox J2000.0 (ICRS)
- Constellation: Pegasus
- Right ascension: 22^{h} 52^{m} 24.07496^{s}
- Declination: +09° 50′ 08.3791″
- Apparent magnitude (V): 5.16 + 13.5

Characteristics
- Spectral type: F6 V or F7 IV + M4 V
- U−B color index: −0.016
- B−V color index: +0.486

Astrometry
Radial velocity (R_{v})	+11.4 km/s
Proper motion (μ)	RA: +521.04 mas/yr Dec.: +42.65 mas/yr
Parallax (π)	36.66±0.29 mas
Distance	89.0 ± 0.7 ly (27.3 ± 0.2 pc)
Absolute magnitude (M_{V})	3.01

Details

σ Peg A
Mass	1.275 M_{☉}
Surface gravity (log g)	3.69 cgs
Temperature	6,250 K
Metallicity [Fe/H]	−0.32 dex
Rotational velocity (v sin i)	3 km/s
Age	2.71±0.61 Gyr

Other designations
- σ Peg, 49 Peg, BD+09°5122, FK5 3828, HD 216385, HIP 112935, HR 8697, SAO 127810

Database references
SIMBAD	data

σ Pegasi, Latinised as Sigma Pegasi, is a binary star system in the northern constellation of Pegasus. With a combined apparent visual magnitude of 5.16, it is faintly visible to the naked eye. Based upon an annual parallax shift of 36.66 mas as seen from Earth, the system is located 89 light years distant from the Sun. It has a relatively high proper motion, advancing across the celestial sphere at the rate of 0.524 arcseconds per year.

The primary, component A, is a yellow-white hued F-type main-sequence star with a stellar classification of F6 V. However, Frasca et al. (2009) lists it as a somewhat more evolved F-type subgiant star with a class of F7 IV. At the age of 2.7 billion years, it has an inactive chromosphere and is spinning with a leisurely projected rotational velocity of 3 km/s. It has a faint, magnitude 13.23 red dwarf companion, designated component B, at an angular separation of 248 arc seconds. The system is most likely (96% chance) a member of the thin disk population of the Milky Way.
