= Abraham Sharp =

English mathematician

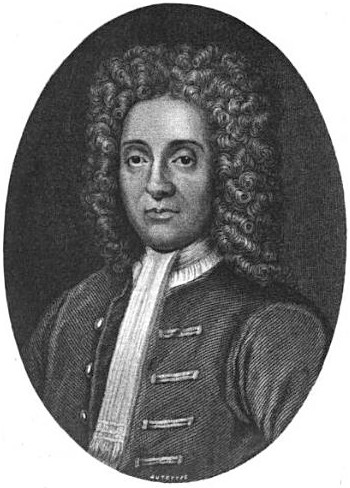
- Born: c. 1653; Little Horton, Bradford, Kingdom of England
- Died: 18 July 1742; Little Horton, Bradford, Kingdom of Great Britain

Abraham Sharp (c. 1653 – 18 July 1742) was an English mathematician and astronomer.

== Life ==
Sharp was born in Horton Hall in Little Horton, Bradford, the son of well-to-do merchant John Sharp and Mary (née Clarkson) Sharp and was educated at Bradford Grammar School.

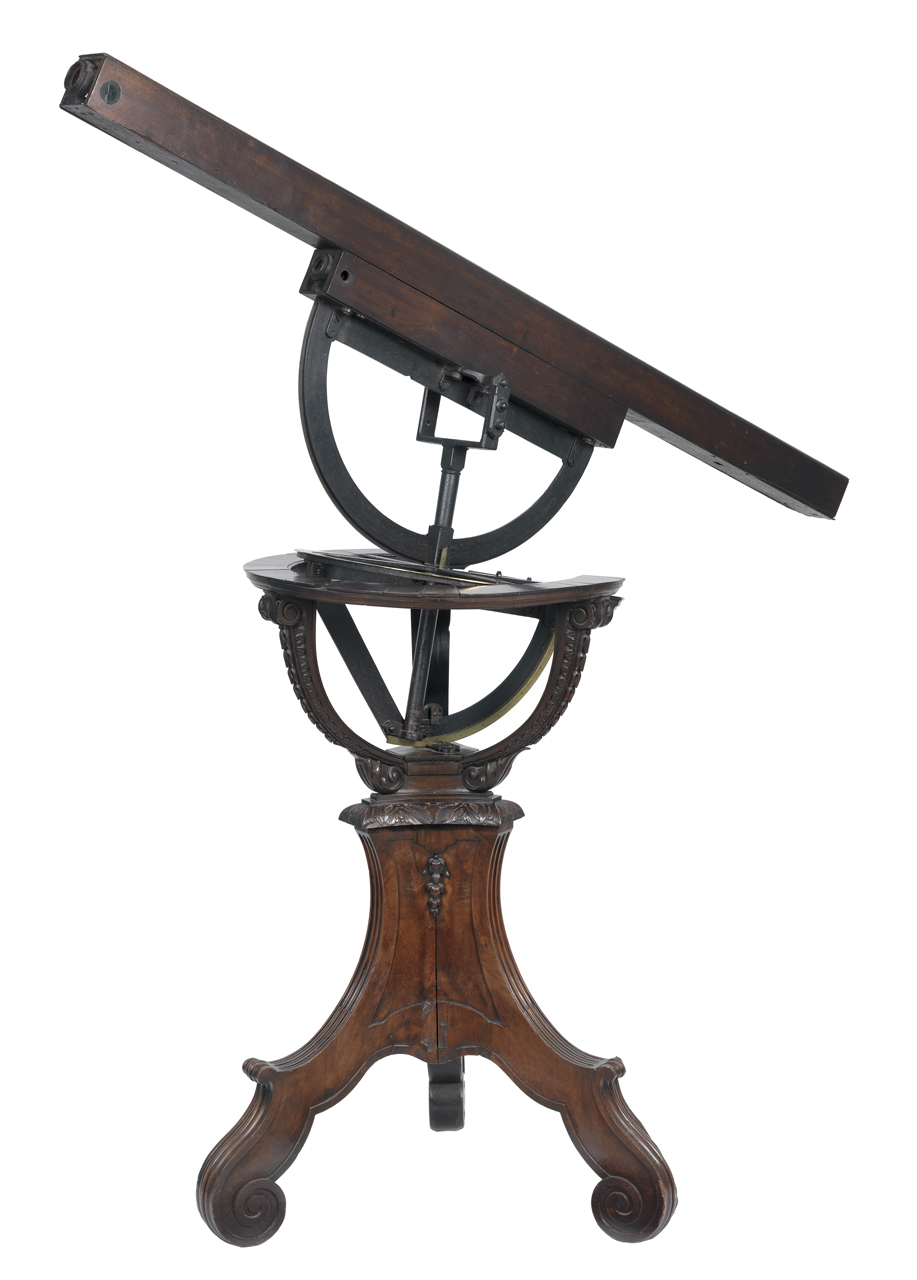
Abraham Sharp's wooden telescope

In 1669 he became a merchant's apprentice before becoming a schoolmaster in Liverpool and subsequently a bookkeeper in London. His wide knowledge of mathematics and astronomy attracted Flamsteed's attention and it was through Flamsteed that Sharp was invited, in 1688, to enter the Greenwich Royal Observatory. There he did notable work, improving instruments and showing great skill as a calculator, publishing Geometry Improved and logarithmic tables.

Sharp calculated pi to 72 decimal places using an arctan sequence, briefly holding the record until John Machin calculated 100 digits in 1706.

He returned to Little Horton in 1694. When the Atlas Coelestis – the largest star map at the time – was published, it contained 26 maps of the major constellations visible from Greenwich, and two planispheres designed by Sharp.

Sharp died in Little Horton in 1742. He had never married. He was a great-uncle of Jesse Ramsden, the scientific instrument maker.

An English translation of a memorial tablet in Latin in Bradford Cathedral carved by Peter Scheemakers translates as " He was rightly counted among the most accomplished mathematicians of his day. He enjoyed constant friendship with the very famous men of the same repute, notably Flamsteed and the illustrious Newton. He drew up the description of the heavens made by the former of these (Flamsteed) in (astronomical) tables of the greatest accuracy; he also published anonymously various writings and descriptions of instruments perfected by himself... .

The crater Sharp on the Moon is named after him.
