= Phi Pegasi =

Variable star in the constellation Pegasus

- Location of φ Pegasi (circled in red)

Observation data Epoch J2000.0 Equinox J2000.0 (ICRS)
- Constellation: Pegasus
- Right ascension: 23^{h} 52^{m} 29.28762^{s}
- Declination: +19° 07′ 13.0218″
- Apparent magnitude (V): 5.05 to 5.12

Characteristics
- Evolutionary stage: red giant
- Spectral type: M2.5 IIIb
- U−B color index: +1.878
- B−V color index: +1.599
- Variable type: SRb

Astrometry
| Radial velocity (R_{v}) | −7.75±0.15 km/s |
| Proper motion (μ) | RA: −7.27 mas/yr Dec.: −35.40 mas/yr |
| Parallax (π) | 7.05±0.27 mas |
| Distance | 460 ± 20 ly (142 ± 5 pc) |

Details
| Mass | 1.57 M_{☉} |
| Radius | 62.7 R_{☉} |
| Luminosity | 1,122 L_{☉} |
| Surface gravity (log g) | 0.81 cgs |
| Temperature | 3,600 K |
| Metallicity [Fe/H] | 0.0 dex |

Other designations
- φ Peg, 81 Peg, BD+18°5231, FK5 898, HD 223768, HIP 117718, HR 9036, SAO 108878

Database references
| SIMBAD | data |

φ Pegasi, Latinised as Phi Pegasi, is a solitary, reddish hued star in the northern constellation of Pegasus. With an apparent visual magnitude of around 5.1, it is a faint star that can be seen with the naked eye. Based upon an annual parallax shift of 7.05 mas as seen from Earth, the system is located around 460 light years distant from the Sun. At that distance, the visual magnitude of the star is diminished by an extinction factor of 0.15 due to interstellar dust.

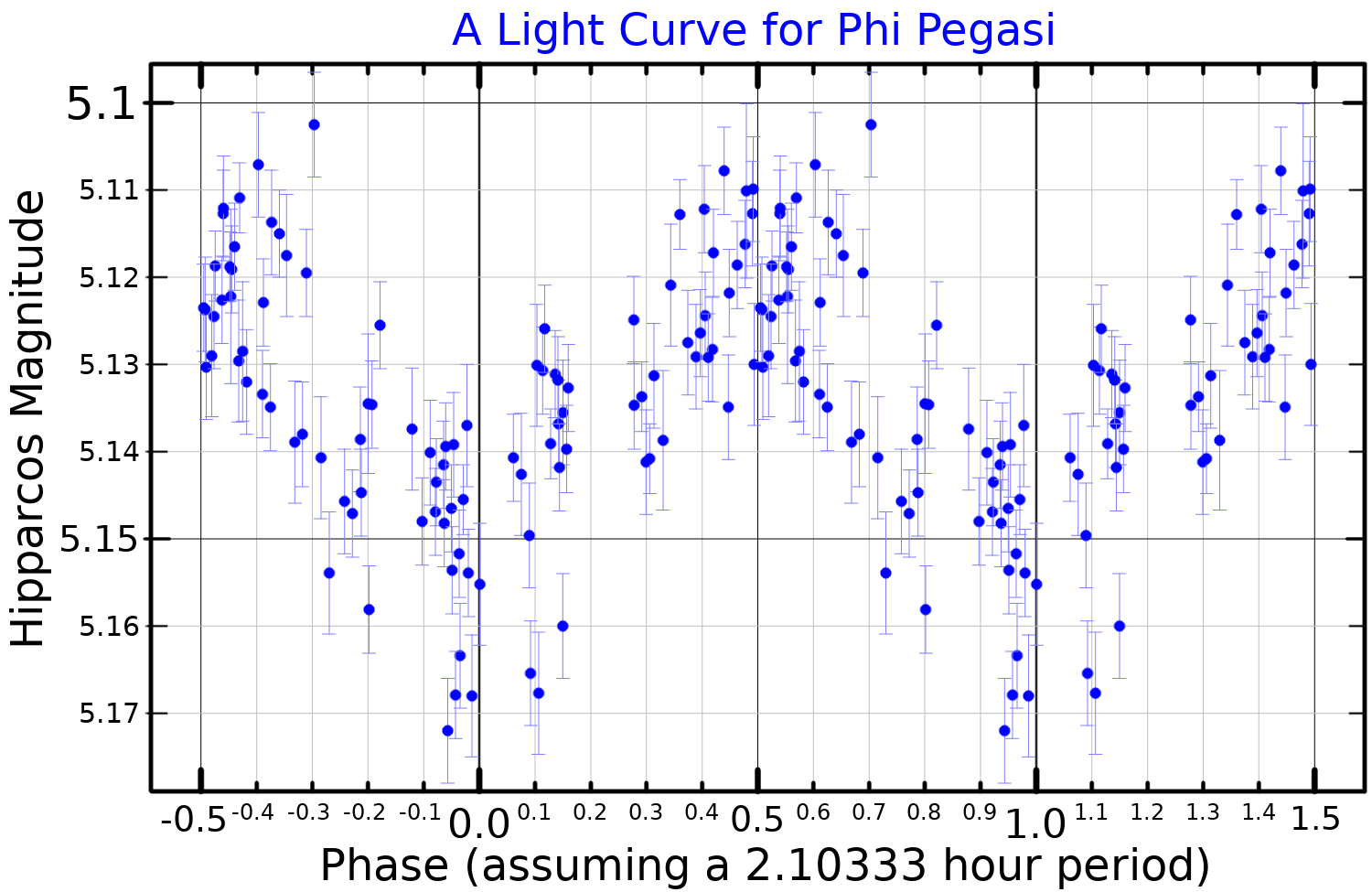
A light curve for Phi Pegasi, plotted from Hipparcos data

This is an evolved red giant star with a stellar classification of M2.5 IIIb. The variability of the brightness of Phi Pegasi was discovered when the Hipparcos data was analyzed. It is a semiregular variable that ranges between magnitudes 5.11 and 5.17. Hipparcos mission photometry gives an amplitude variation of 0.0148 in magnitude with a frequency of 11.4 cycles per day. It is likely to be a semiregular variable and is tentatively classified as type SRb.

In terms of its right ascension coordinates, φ Pegasi is located very near the line of the vernal equinox and will cross over around the year 3030, due to the precession of the Earth's axis.
