= John Flamsteed =

English astronomer (1646–1719)

John Flamsteed FRS
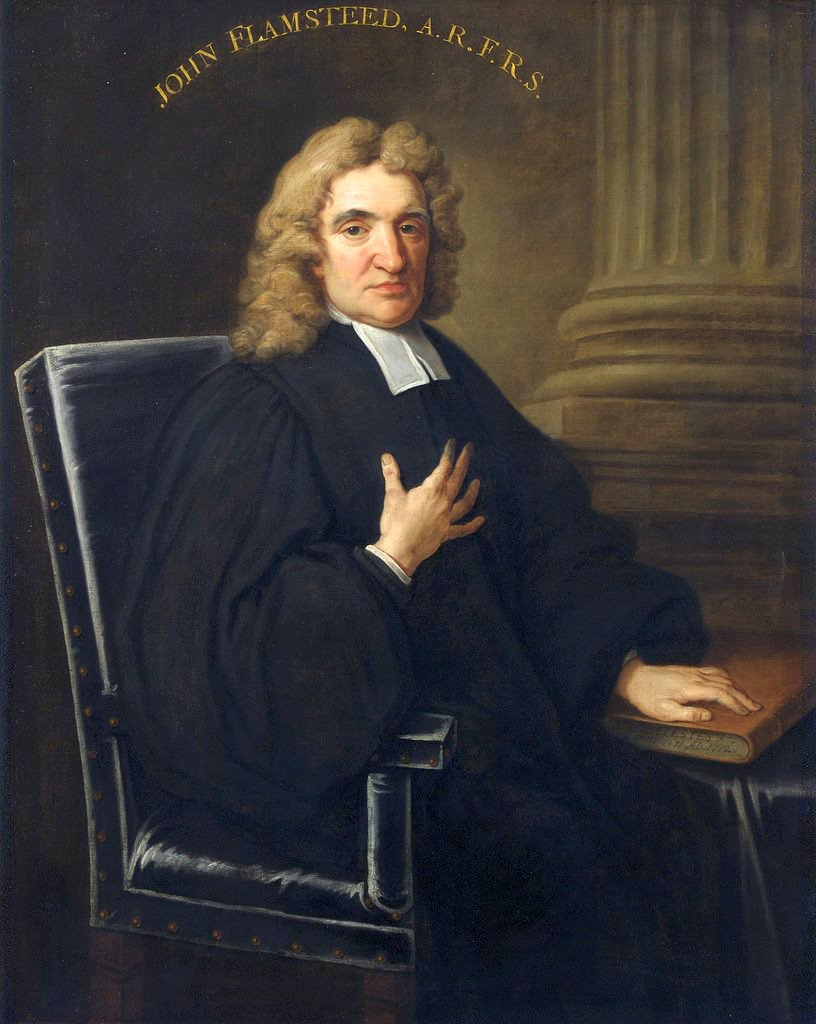
- Portrait by Thomas Gibson, 1712
- Born: 19 August 1646; Denby, Derbyshire, England
- Died: 31 December 1719 (aged 73); Burstow, Surrey, England
- Education: Jesus College, Cambridge
- Known for: First Astronomer Royal
- Spouse: Margaret Cooke
- Scientific career
- Fields: Astronomy

1st Astronomer Royal
- In office 1675–1719
- Succeeded by: Edmond Halley

John Flamsteed (19 August 1646 – 31 December 1719) (Note: In this article dates on or before 2 September 1752 in the United Kingdom are given in this article in the Julian calendar, but 1 January is always treated as the beginning of the year, even though 25 March was treated as the beginning of the year before 1753 in England.) was an English astronomer and the first Astronomer Royal. His main achievements were the preparation of a 3,000-star catalogue, Catalogus Britannicus, and a star atlas called Atlas Coelestis, both published posthumously. He also made the first recorded observations of Uranus, although he mistakenly catalogued it as a star, and he laid the foundation stone for the Royal Greenwich Observatory.

== Life ==
Flamsteed was born in Denby, Derbyshire, England, the only son of Stephen Flamsteed and his first wife, Mary Spadman. He was educated at the free school of Derby and at Derby School, in St Peter's Churchyard, Derby, near where his father carried on a malting business. At that time, most masters of the school were Puritans. Flamsteed had a solid knowledge of Latin, essential for reading the scientific literature of the day, and a love of history, leaving the school in May 1662.

His progress to Jesus College, Cambridge, recommended by the Master of Derby School, was delayed by some years of chronic ill health. During those years, Flamsteed gave his father some help in his business, and from his father learnt arithmetic and the use of fractions, developing a keen interest in mathematics and astronomy. In July 1662, he was fascinated by the thirteenth-century work of Johannes de Sacrobosco, De sphaera mundi, and on 12 September 1662 observed his first partial solar eclipse. Early in 1663, he read Thomas Fale's Horologiographia: The Art of Dialling, which set off an interest in sundials. In the summer of 1663, he read Wingate's Canon, William Oughtred's Canon, and Thomas Stirrup's Art of Dialling. At about the same time, he acquired Thomas Street's Astronomia Carolina, or A New Theory of the Celestial Motions (Caroline Tables). He associated himself with local gentlemen interested in astronomy, including William Litchford, whose library included the work of the astrologer John Gadbury which included astronomical tables by Jeremiah Horrocks, who had died in 1641 at the age of twenty-two. Flamsteed was greatly impressed (as Isaac Newton had been) by the work of Horrocks.

In August 1665, at the age of nineteen and as a gift for his friend Litchford, Flamsteed wrote his first paper on astronomy, entitled Mathematical Essays, concerning the design, use and construction of an astronomer's quadrant, including tables for the latitude of Derby. In September 1670, Flamsteed visited Cambridge and entered his name as an undergraduate at Jesus College. While it seems he never took up full residence, he was there for two months in 1674, and had the opportunity to hear Isaac Newton's Lucasian Lectures.

Ordained a deacon, he was preparing to take up a living in Derbyshire when he was invited to London by his patron Jonas Moore, Surveyor-General of the Ordnance. Moore had recently made an offer to the Royal Society to pay for the establishment of an observatory. These plans were, however, preempted when Charles II was persuaded by his mistress, Louise de Kérouaille, Duchess of Portsmouth, to hear about a proposal to find longitude by the position of the Moon from an individual known as Le Sieur de St Pierre. Charles appointed a Royal Commission to examine the proposal in December 1674, consisting of Lord Brouncker, Seth Ward, Samuel Moreland, Christopher Wren, Silius Titus, John Pell and Robert Hooke.

Having arrived in London on 2 February 1675, and staying with Jonas Moore at the Tower of London, Flamsteed had the opportunity to be taken by Titus to meet the King. He was subsequently admitted as an official Assistant to the Royal Commission and supplied observations in order to test St Pierre's proposal and to offer his own comments. The commission's conclusions were that, although St Pierre's proposal was not worth further consideration, the King should consider establishing an observatory and appointing an observer in order to better map the stars and the motions of the Moon in order to underpin the successful development of the lunar-distance method of finding longitude.

On 4 March 1675 Flamsteed was appointed by royal warrant "The King's Astronomical Observator" – the first English Astronomer Royal, with an allowance of £100 a year. The warrant stated his task as "rectifieing the Tables of the motions of the Heavens, and the places of the fixed stars, so as to find out the so much desired Longitude of places for Perfecteing the Art of Navigation". In June 1675, another royal warrant provided for the founding of the Royal Greenwich Observatory, and Flamsteed laid the foundation stone on 10 August.

In February 1676, he was admitted a Fellow of the Royal Society, and in July, he moved into the Observatory. In 1684 he was "[e]levated to the priesthood [and] appointed rector" of the small village of Burstow, near Crawley in Surrey. He held that office, as well as that of Astronomer Royal, until his death in 1719. He is buried at Burstow, and the east window in the church was dedicated to him as a memorial.

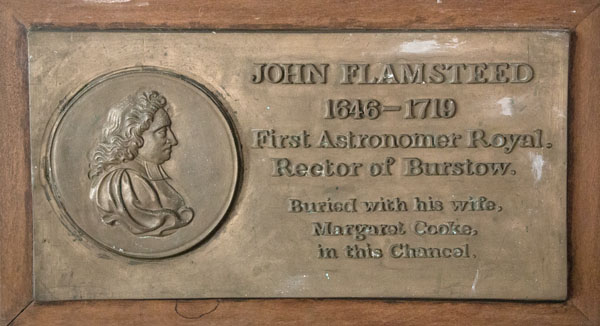
Plaque marking the grave of John Flamsteed and his wife in the chancel of St Bartholomew's Church in Burstow, Surrey

The will of Flamsteed's widow, Margaret, left instructions for her own remains to be deposited "in the same Grave in which Mr John Flamsteed is buryed in the Chancell of Burstow Church". She also left instructions, and twenty five pounds, for the executor of her will to place "in the aforesaid Chancell of Burstow … A Marble stone or Monument, with an inscription in Latin, in memory of the late Reverend Mr. John Flamsteed". It seems no such monument was created, and almost 200 years later, a plaque was placed to mark his burial in the chancel. After his death, his papers and scientific instruments were taken by his widow. The papers were returned many years later, but the instruments disappeared.

== Scientific work ==
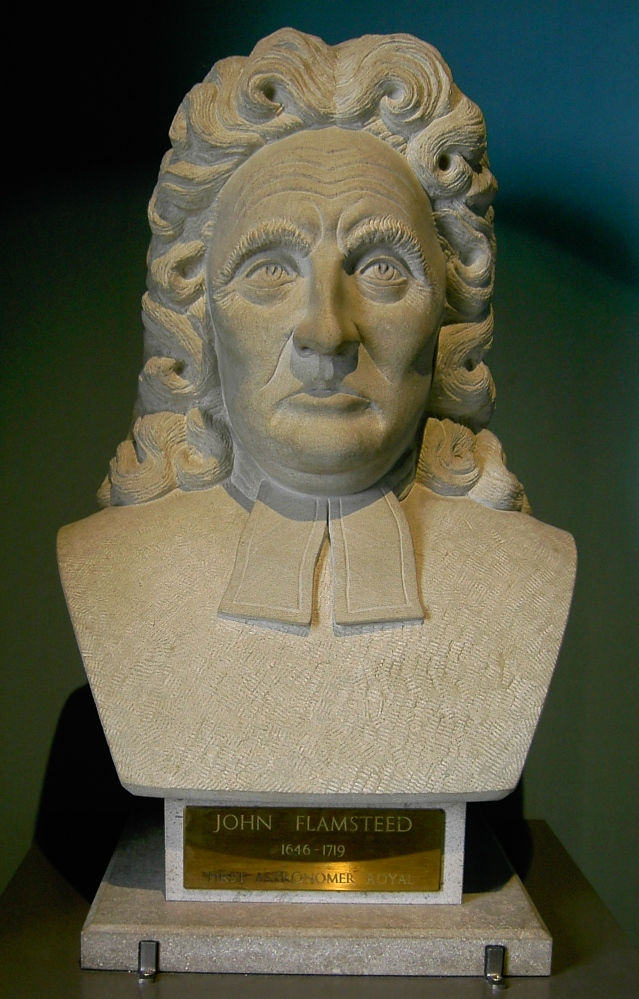
Bust of John Flamsteed in the Museum of the Royal Greenwich Observatory

Flamsteed accurately calculated the solar eclipses of 1666 and 1668. He was responsible for several of the earliest recorded sightings of the planet Uranus, which he mistook for a star and catalogued as '34 Tauri'. The first of these was in December 1690, which remains the earliest known sighting of Uranus by an astronomer.

In October 1672, when Mars was in opposition, Flamsteed used eyepieces with illuminated micrometer reticle carrying double cross-hairs, to measure Mars' diurnal parallax, thus allowing Flamsteed to estimate the distance to Mars and hence the astronomical unit. To this end, Flamsteed compared the apparent shift of Mars during the night with respect to other stars, this shift being superimposed on Mars' apparent night-to-night course among the stars.

On 16 August 1680 Flamsteed catalogued a star, 3 Cassiopeiae, that later astronomers were unable to corroborate. Three hundred years later, the American astronomical historian William Ashworth suggested that what Flamsteed may have seen was the most recent supernova in the galaxy's history, an event which would leave as its remnant the strongest radio source outside of the Solar System, known in the third Cambridge (3C) catalogue as 3C 461 and commonly called Cassiopeia A by astronomers. Because the position of "3 Cassiopeiae" does not precisely match that of Cassiopeia A, and because the expansion wave associated with the explosion has been worked backward to the year 1667 and not 1680, some historians feel that all Flamsteed may have done was incorrectly note the position of a star already known.

In 1681 Flamsteed proposed that the two great comets observed in November and December 1680 were not separate bodies, but rather a single comet travelling first towards the Sun and then away from it. Although Isaac Newton first disagreed with Flamsteed, he later came to agree with him and theorized that comets, like planets, moved around the Sun in large, closed elliptical orbits. Flamsteed later learned that Newton had gained access to his observations and data through Edmond Halley, his former assistant with whom he previously had a cordial relationship.

As Astronomer Royal, Flamsteed spent some forty years observing and making meticulous records for his star catalogue, which would eventually triple the number of entries in Tycho Brahe's sky atlas. Unwilling to risk his reputation by releasing unverified data, he kept the incomplete records under seal at Greenwich. In 1712, Isaac Newton, then President of the Royal Society, and Edmond Halley again obtained Flamsteed's data and published a pirated star catalogue. Flamsteed managed to gather three hundred of the four hundred printings and burned them. "If Sir I.N. would be sensible of it, I have done both him and Dr. Halley a great kindness," he wrote to his assistant Abraham Sharp. The data from the pirated catalogue were used by the London cartographer John Senex to produce star charts in the 1720s before Flamsteed's own charts were ready.

In 1725 Flamsteed's own version of Historia Coelestis Britannica was published posthumously, edited by his wife, Margaret Flamsteed. This contained Flamsteed's observations, and included a catalogue of 2,935 stars to much greater accuracy than any prior work. It was considered the first significant contribution of the Greenwich Observatory, and the numerical Flamsteed designations for stars that were added subsequently to a French edition are still in use. In 1729 his wife published his Atlas Coelestis, assisted by Joseph Crosthwait and Abraham Sharp, who were responsible for the technical side.

== Honours ==
- Fellow of the Royal Society (1677)
- The Flamsteed Astronomy Society is named in his honour, and is based at The Royal Observatory Greenwich.
- The crater Flamsteed on the Moon is named after him.
- The asteroid 4987 Flamsteed is named in his honour.
- He is commemorated in several Derbyshire schools. The science block at John Port Spencer Academy is named Flamsteed, John Flamsteed Community School in Denby carries his name. Flamsteed House at the Ecclesbourne School in Duffield is also named after him.
- Derby City Council erected a Blue Plaque in his honour at the Queen Street former Clock Works in Derby, which also honours Joseph Wright of Derby who lived in the house formerly owned by Flamsteed.

== See also ==
- Flamsteed objects
- 3 Cassiopeiae (possibly a supernova sighting or recording error)
