= Atlas Coelestis =

Star atlas

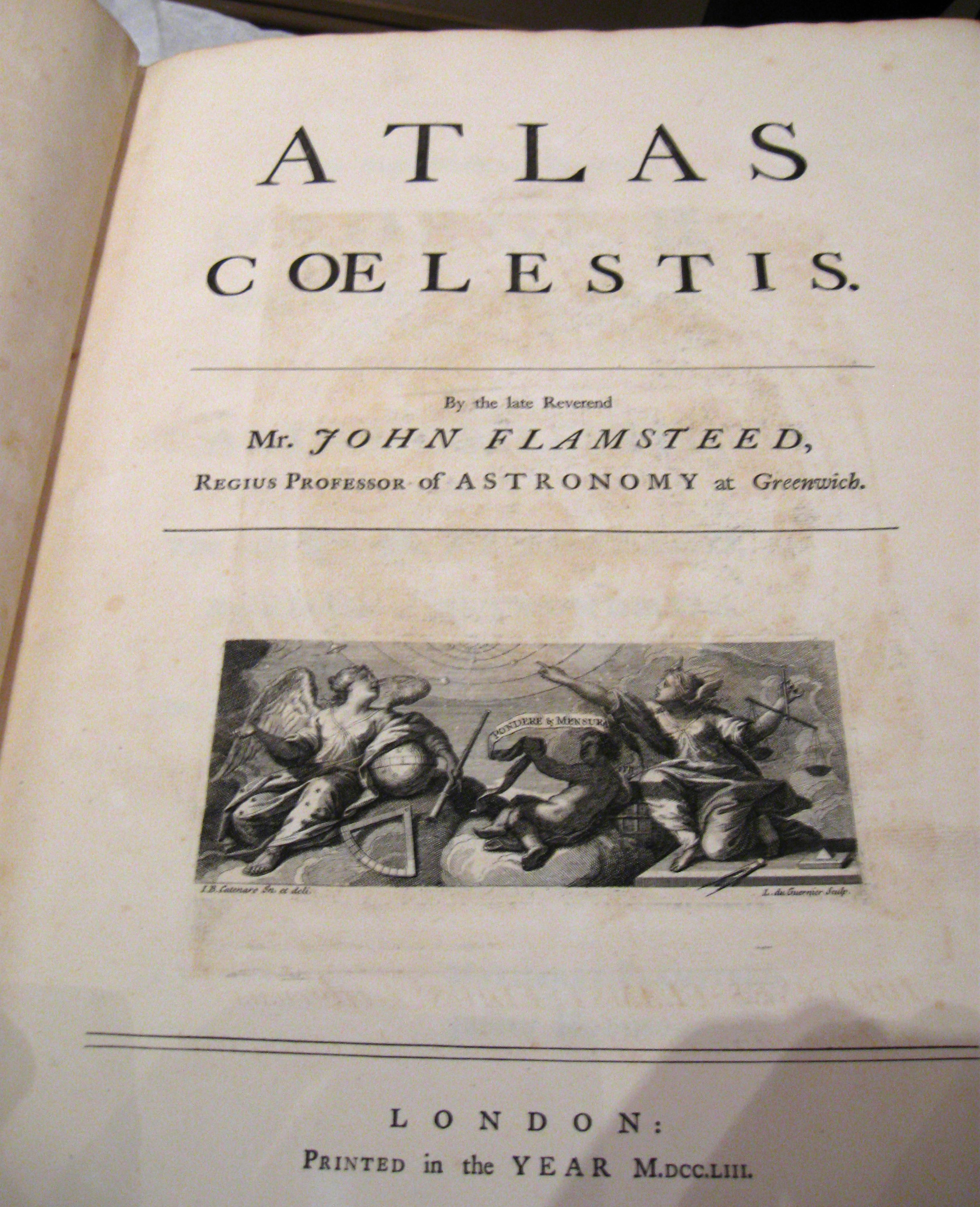
- Title page of the 1753 edition (copy owned by the Derby Museum and Art Gallery).
- Author: John Flamsteed
- Illustrator: James Thornhill
- Subject: Astronomy
- Publication date: 1729
- Publication place: England

The Atlas Coelestis is a star atlas published posthumously in 1729, based on observations made by the First Astronomer Royal, John Flamsteed.

The Atlas – the largest that ever had been published and the first comprehensive telescopic star catalogue and companion celestial atlas – contains 26 maps of the major constellations visible from Greenwich, with drawings made in the Rococo style by James Thornhill. It also presents two planispheres designed by Abraham Sharp.

== History ==
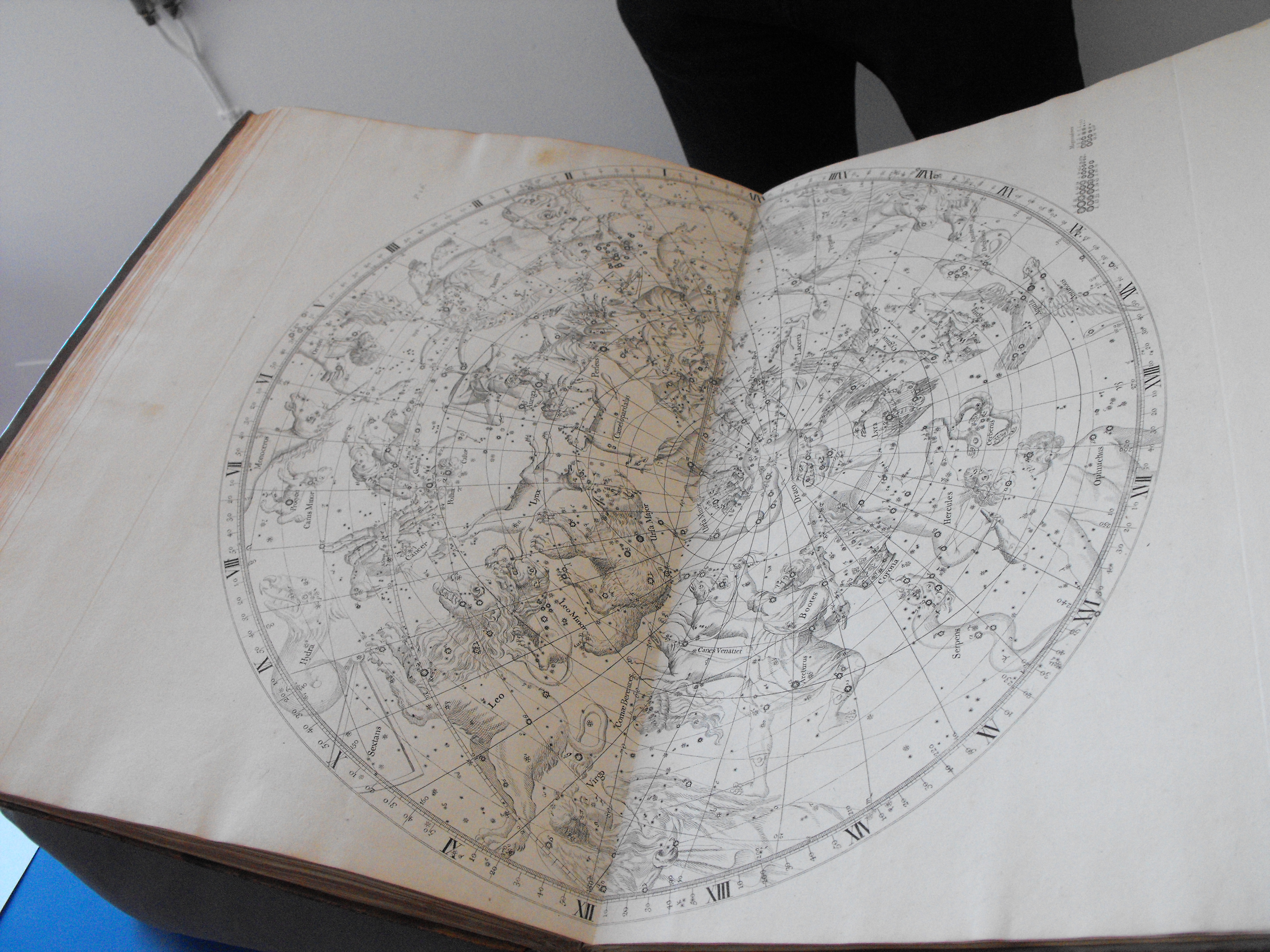
Atlas Coelestis by John Flamsteed (2nd ed. 1753).

The first stellar atlas based in telescopic observations, the Atlas Coelestis was published only ten years after the death of Flamsteed, by his widow, assisted by Joseph Crosthwait and Abraham Sharp. It was preceded by the opus "Stellarum inerrantium Catalogus Britannicus" (or simply "British Catalogue", published in 1725, with 2919 stars).

One of Flamsteed's main motivations to produce the Atlas, was to correct the representation of the figures of the constellations, as made by Bayer in his "Uranometria" (1603). Bayer represented the figures viewed from behind (not from the front, as was done since the time of Ptolemy), and these new positions contradicted the traditional star descriptions (i.e., Ptolemy's "star in the right shoulder" of Orion had become, in Bayer's rendering, the star in the left shoulder) and created unnecessary confusion.

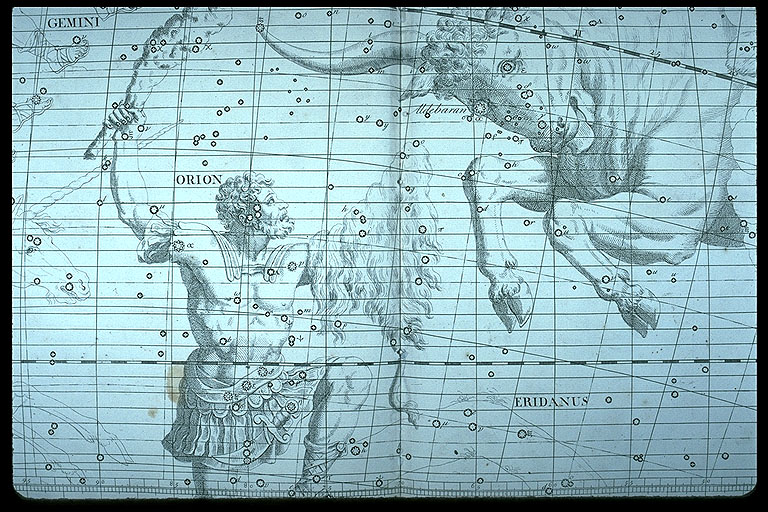
Orion, as seen in Flamsteed's Atlas Coelestis.

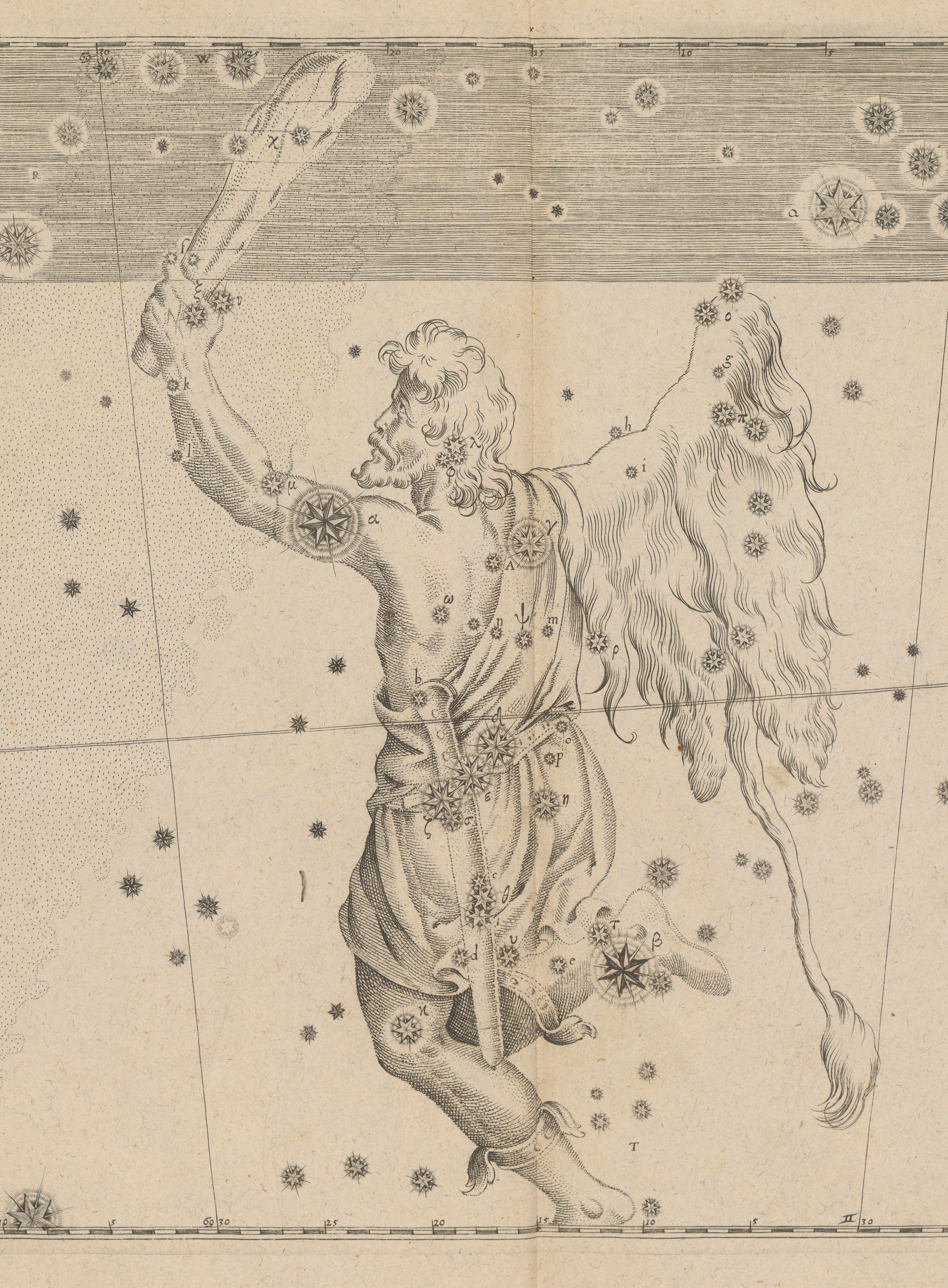
Orion, as seen in Bayer's Uranometria.

The publication enjoyed immediate success, becoming the standard reference for professional astronomers for nearly a century. Even so, three objections have been raised regarding it: the high price, great size (making it difficult to handle) and low artistic quality (many criticisms were made to the drawings by James Thornhill, particularly regarding the representation of Aquarius).

This led John Bevis to try to improve the Atlas. In 1745, he produced the "Uranographia Britannica", with smaller dimensions, updated with observations and more artistic pictures. However, this atlas was never officially published and at the present, there are only 16 known copies.

== The Atlas Fortin-Flamsteed ==
Finally, the changes in the positions of stars (the original observations were made in the 1690s), led to an update made in 1776 by the French engineer Jean Nicolas Fortin, supervised by the astronomers Le Monnier and Messier, from the Royal Academy of Sciences in Paris.

The new version, called Atlas Fortin-Flamsteed, had 1/3 of the size of the original, but kept the same table structure. There is also some artistic retouching to some illustrations (mostly Andromeda, Virgo and Aquarius). Fortin called this the Second Edition because he regarded Flamsteed’s original as the First Edition.

The names of the constellations are in French (not in Latin) and the Atlas included some nebulae discovered after the death of Flamsteed.

In 1795, a third edition was published, produced by Pierre Méchain and Jérôme Lalande, with new constellations and many more nebulae. A Portuguese edition appeared in 1804, translated by the Portuguese astronomer and cartographer Francisco António Ciera (1763–1814).
