= Star polygons in art and culture =

Polygons as symbolic elements

Star polygons and polygonal compounds are the basis for numerous figures of significance in arts and culture. The figure may be the border or interior of the polygon, or one or more closed polygonal paths that include all of the border and also have some legs crossing the interior. The name is derived from the polygon's similarity to the diffraction spikes of astronomical stars, but specific uses may exploit the connection or not. Stars often represent the unity of states within a country when they are used as a part of the flag.

== Emblematic use ==
- In heraldry, a mullet is a star with straight arms and typically five points. A star with wavy rather than straight rays is called an estoile. The mullet, used as an heraldic charge, is the ensign of knightly rank, and every order of knighthood incorporates this symbol in some way. It has traditionally been used in British heraldry as a mark of cadency for the third son.
- In Christian art, St. Bruno bears a star on his breast; Saint Dominic, Saint Humbert and Saint Peter of Alcantara have a star on their head or forehead.
- The star with six (or less commonly five, sometimes seven) points is associated with law enforcement in the United States, and forms the basis of the sheriff's badge.

== Three-pointed stars ==
Flag of the International Brigades

The three-pointed star is used much less often than other types of stars. but it appears in one of the versions of the flag of the International Brigades in the Spanish civil war. It also appears in the symbol of the Mercedes-Benz car manufacturer.

== Four-pointed stars ==
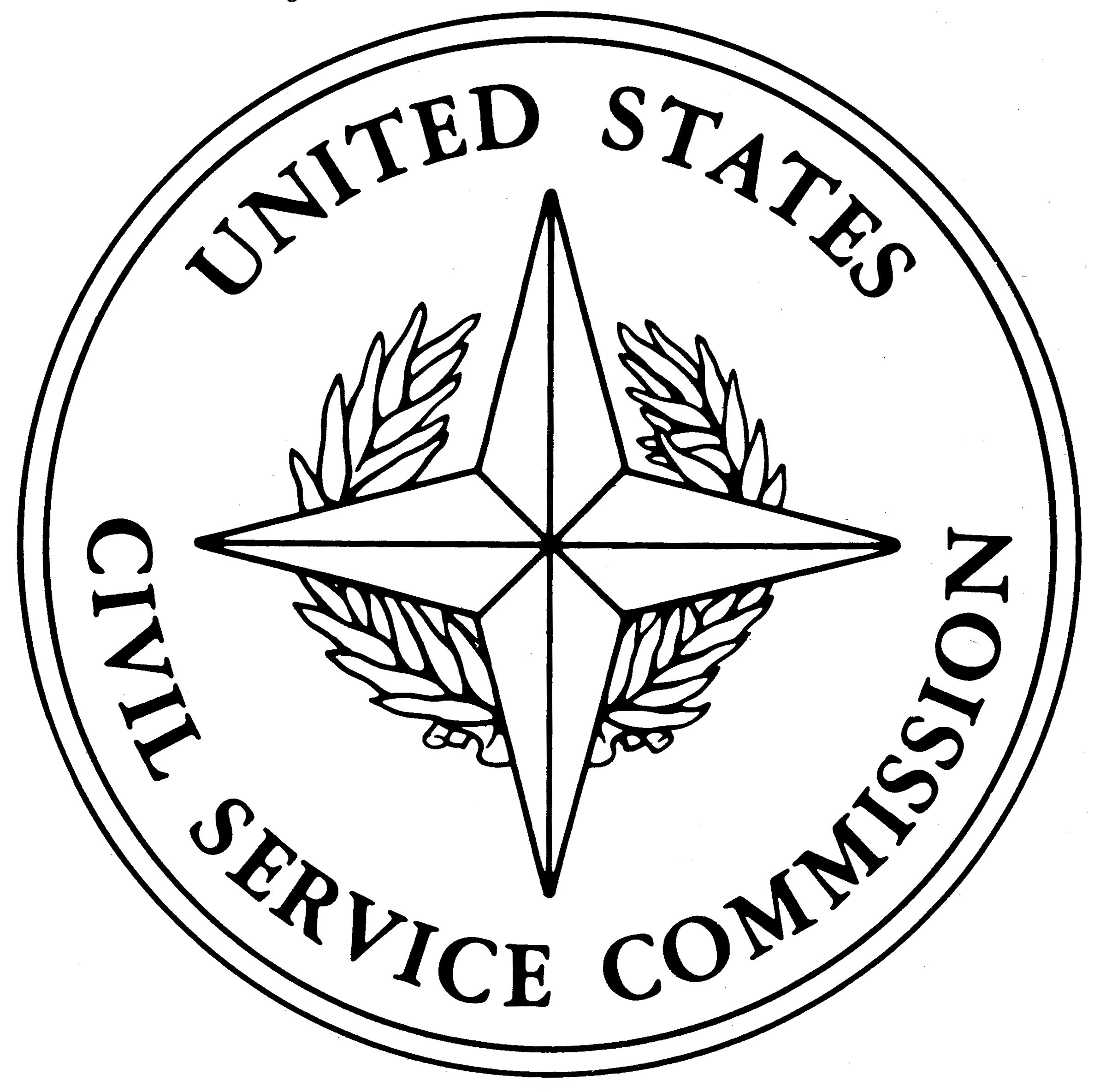
Seal of United States Civil Service Commission

Several varieties of four-pointed stars were used in cultures around the world:

The 1914-15 star campaign medal of the British army was based on a four-pointed star. A compass rose in the form of a four pointed-star also appears in the flag of NATO and the flag of the country of Aruba. The seal of the (now cancelled) United States Civil Service Commission included a four-pointed star between the years 1963-1979. Four-pointed stars also appears in the symbols of the Subaru car company and Philips corporation.

Recently, the four-pointed star and its associated emoji (✨) has become a symbol often used to represent AI.

== Five-pointed stars ==
Five-pointed star

The five-pointed star, if drawn with points of equal length and angles of 36° at each point, is sometimes termed a golden five pointed star. If the colinear edges are joined, a pentagram is produced, which is the simplest of the unicursal star polygons, and a symbol of mystical and magical significance. The golden five-pointed star is a very common ideogram in the western world, and has particularly strong associations with military power and war. Many communist countries (such as China and Vietnam) and symbols also incorporate five-pointed stars.

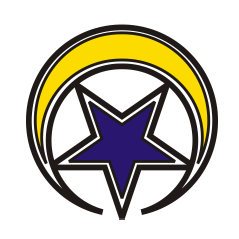
Union Army, VII Corps, 3rd Division Badge

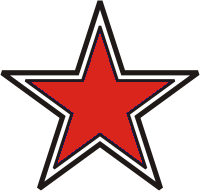
Union Army, XII Corps, 3rd Division Badge

The five-pointed star appears in the flags of 35 countries, and also appears commonly in the heraldry of the United States, and stands in contrast to the vexillologically rarer seven-pointed star.

The five-pointed star occurs in conjunction with a crescent in the flags of several countries to symbolize Islam, appearing for example as part of the symbol of the Ottoman Empire.

In philately, the five-pointed star signifies stamps that have not been postmarked.

The five-pointed star is used as the symbol of the People Nation alliance of gangs from Chicago. Blood gangs who originated from New York, known as the United Blood Nation, also use this as a symbol as they have emulated the People Nation alliance.

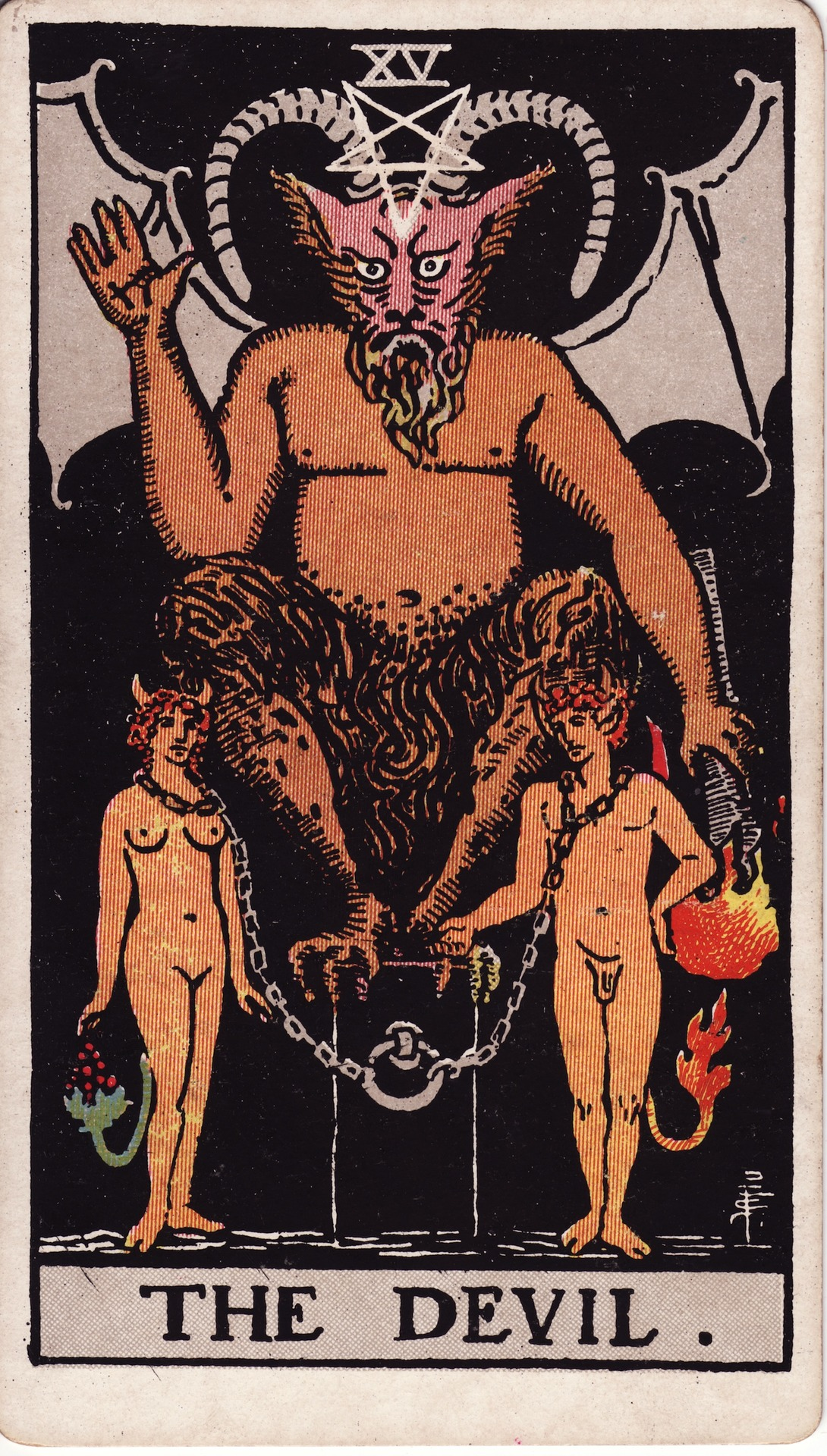
A pentagram with a point facing downward was used as a symbol of the devil in Romanticism and in modern Satanism.

In the Armenian Pantheon, there is a goddess called Astlik/Astghik. In the Armenian language Astgh means star, Astghik - Little Star. Compared with Ishtar, Astara, this goddess' sign should have been the (probably)eight-pointed star.

The pentagram, a five-pointed star drawn with five straight strokes

The star and crescent symbol is mostly shown with five-pointed stars in modern flags, but in the oldest Ottoman flag of this design as well as the flag of Azerbaijan, the star is eight-pointed.

The 1777 Flag of the United States had 13 stars of an unspecified number of points.

== Six-pointed stars ==
Several varieties of six-pointed stars are used in cultures around the world:

- If the collinear edges of a regular six-pointed star are connected, so that two interlaced triangles are formed, a symbol results that is variously known as the hexagram, Star of David, or Shield of David (Magen David). This symbol is most commonly associated with Judaism. It is also used in Christianity, Islam and Hinduism, but less frequently.
- The Ahmadiyya flag, Lawa-e-Ahmaddiyat, contains a six-pointed star, adjacent to a crescent.
- The Star of Life, which is a six-armed cross.
- The municipal flag of Chicago has four six-pointed stars.
- In the flag of Nagaland the six-pointed Star of Bethlehem is a symbol of the Christian identity of the Naga people.
- German and German-American hex signs and barn stars often incorporate both five- and six-pointed stars as central themes.
- The six-pointed star is used as the symbol for the Folk Nation alliance of gangs from Chicago. Crip gang members tend to use this symbol also.
- The coat of arms of Central Croatia depicted a six-pointed star and a crescent. This is also incorporated in the national coat of arms of Croatia.
- The coat of arms of Slavonia has a six-pointed star above a white-red band with pine marten. This is also incorporated in the national coat of arms of Croatia.
- The coat of arms of Slovenia incorporate three six-pointed stars, which was the symbol of the Counts of Celje, the great Slovene dynastic house between the 14th and 15th centuries.

Apart from these, six-pointed star formations are rare as an ideograph in Western cultures except in the case of law enforcement badges. In astrology, a six-pointed star can represent a Grand Sextile, a rare planetary configuration in which six planets are arranged around the Zodiac at approximately 60 degree intervals. On gravestones stars can occasionally appear before a date of birth serving as a symbol of birth. Five pointed stars are documented in this usage, although the meaning of each individual six pointed star may vary.

Star of David

Ahmadiyya flag

All for Australia League emblem

Chicago Flag

Flag of Northern Ireland, 1953–1972

Flag of Nagaland with the Star of Bethlehem symbol

== Seven-pointed stars ==
=== Political ===
A seven-pointed star appears in the flag and heraldic symbolism of Australia. In the Australian context, the seven points (also known as the Commonwealth Star, the Federation Star, the Seven Point Star, or the Star of Federation) is a seven-pointed star symbolising the Federation of Australia which came into force on 1 January 1901. Six points of the Star represent the six original states of the Commonwealth of Australia, while the seventh point represents the territories.

The seven-pointed stars stand in contrast to the vexillologically more conventional five-pointed stars.

The Seal of the Cherokee Nation has an acute gold seven-pointed star in its seal.

The seven-pointed star is also used as a symbol of the Trinitarios gang from New York City.

Flag of Australia

Flag of Jordan

1924 Flag of Iraq

=== Heptagram ===
A heptagram or septagram is a seven-pointed star drawn with seven straight strokes. There are two kinds of heptagrams:

- Acute heptagram, the {7/3} star polygon.
- Obtuse heptagram, the {7/2} star polygon.

== Eight-pointed stars ==
=== Political ===
1959 Flag of Iraq

Flag of Azerbaijan

Flag of Ha'il state (1834–1921)

Flag of Minnesota (2024-present)

=== Other ===
The eight-pointed star is widely used in the Arabic states in decorative art,. It is sometimes similar to the Star of Lakshmi formed from overlapping squares but may also appear in the form of the Rub el Hizb which adds a central circle to the design.

Star of Lakshmi

Rub el Hizb

A two-color, 8-pointed star associated with the American Friends Service Committee and other Quaker service groups since the 1870s is sometimes called "the Quaker star".

== Nine-pointed stars ==
A nine-pointed star is the most common symbol of the Baháʼí Faith, the number nine being significant in the religion.

== Eleven-pointed stars ==
The flag of the Federation of Malaya used the eleven-pointed star from 1950 until 1963, with the star representing the 11 member states of the federation.

Flag of Malaya

== Twelve-pointed stars ==
The flag of Nauru uses a twelve-pointed star representing the 12 tribes on the island.

Flag of Nauru

== Fourteen-pointed stars ==
In the Church of Nativity in Bethlehem the traditionally location of the birth of Jesus is marked by a silver star with 14 points that represents the three sets of 14 generations in the genealogy of Jesus. The flag of Malaysia uses the Federal Star, a fourteen-pointed star representing the unity between the 13 member states and the federal government.

Flag of Malaysia

== See also ==
- Gallery of flags with stars
- List of symbolic stars
- Star (grapheme)
- Star polygon
