= List of symbolic stars =

This is a list of symbolic uses of "star" ideograms.

- Star (classification), a scoring system for hotels, restaurants and movies
- Star (football badge), representing trophies won by a football team
- Barnstar, a decorative painted object or image often used to adorn a barn
- Brunswick star, an eight- or sixteen-pointed star surrounding the British Royal Cypher, used on police badges
- Hex sign, a form of Pennsylvania Dutch folk art
- Mullet (heraldry), unconventional shapes of stars on coats-of-arms
- Nautical star, a popular tattoo design
- Red star, a political symbol of communism and socialism
- Star of Life, representing emergency medical services units and personnel

== Geometry ==
- Star polygon, a star drawn with a number of lines equal to the number of points
  - Pentagram, a five-pointed star polygon
    - Five-pointed star, a pentagram with internal line segments removed
    - Lute of Pythagoras, a pentagram-based fractal pattern
  - Hexagram, a six-pointed star polygon
  - Heptagram, a seven-pointed star polygon
  - Octagram, an eight-pointed star polygon
  - Enneagram, a nine-pointed star polygon
  - Decagram, a ten-pointed star polygon
  - Hendecagram, an eleven-pointed star polygon
  - Dodecagram, a twelve-pointed star polygon
  - Magic star, a star polygon in which numbers can be placed at each of the vertices and intersections, such that the four numbers on each line sum to the same "magic" constant

== Typography ==
- Star (glyph), any of a number of star-shaped glyphs in typography
  - Asterisk, a typographical symbol (*)
  - Arabic star, a typographical symbol developed to be distinct from the asterisk

== Medals and awards ==
- 1-, 2-, 3-, 4-, or 5-star rank, officer ranks used in many armed services, as well as the rare 6-star rank.
- Africa Star, awarded by the British Commonwealth for service in World War II.
- Award star, issued by the United States military for meritorious action in combat.
- Bronze Star Medal, a United States Armed Forces individual military decoration.
- Gold star, the highest state decoration in the Soviet Union and several post-Soviet states.
- Service star, an attachment to a military decoration which denotes participation in military campaigns or multiple bestowals of the same award.
- Silver Star, a military decoration which can be awarded to a member of any branch of the United States Armed Forces.
- Order of the White Star, an Estonian civilian public service award.
- Star Scout, a rank in the Boy Scouts of America.

== Religious and supernatural uses ==
- Star of David, or Jewish Star, a hexagram symbolizing Israel, Judeans, and/or Jews; properly speaking, this "star" is called the "Shield of David," (Magen David), while the pentagram is the "Star of David." Note that this is a cultural, rather than religious symbol.
- Star of Lakshmi, a Hindu symbol associated with the goddess Lakshmi
- Star of Ishtar, an ancient symbol associated with the Mesopotamian goddess Ishtar
- Star and crescent, an Islamic symbol
- The Star (Tarot card), one of the Major Arcana
- Druze star, a symbol of the Druze religion
- Marian star, a six-pointed star used as a Roman Catholic symbol of celestial objects
- Rub el Hizb, a common Islamic symbol
- alQuds Star, a star representing 'alQuds' (Jerusalem)
- Haykal, a five-pointed star that represents the Bahá'í Faith
- Nine-pointed star, a common symbol of the Bahá'í Faith that represents unity and Bahá’.
