= Shamsa =

Intricately decorated rosette or medallion

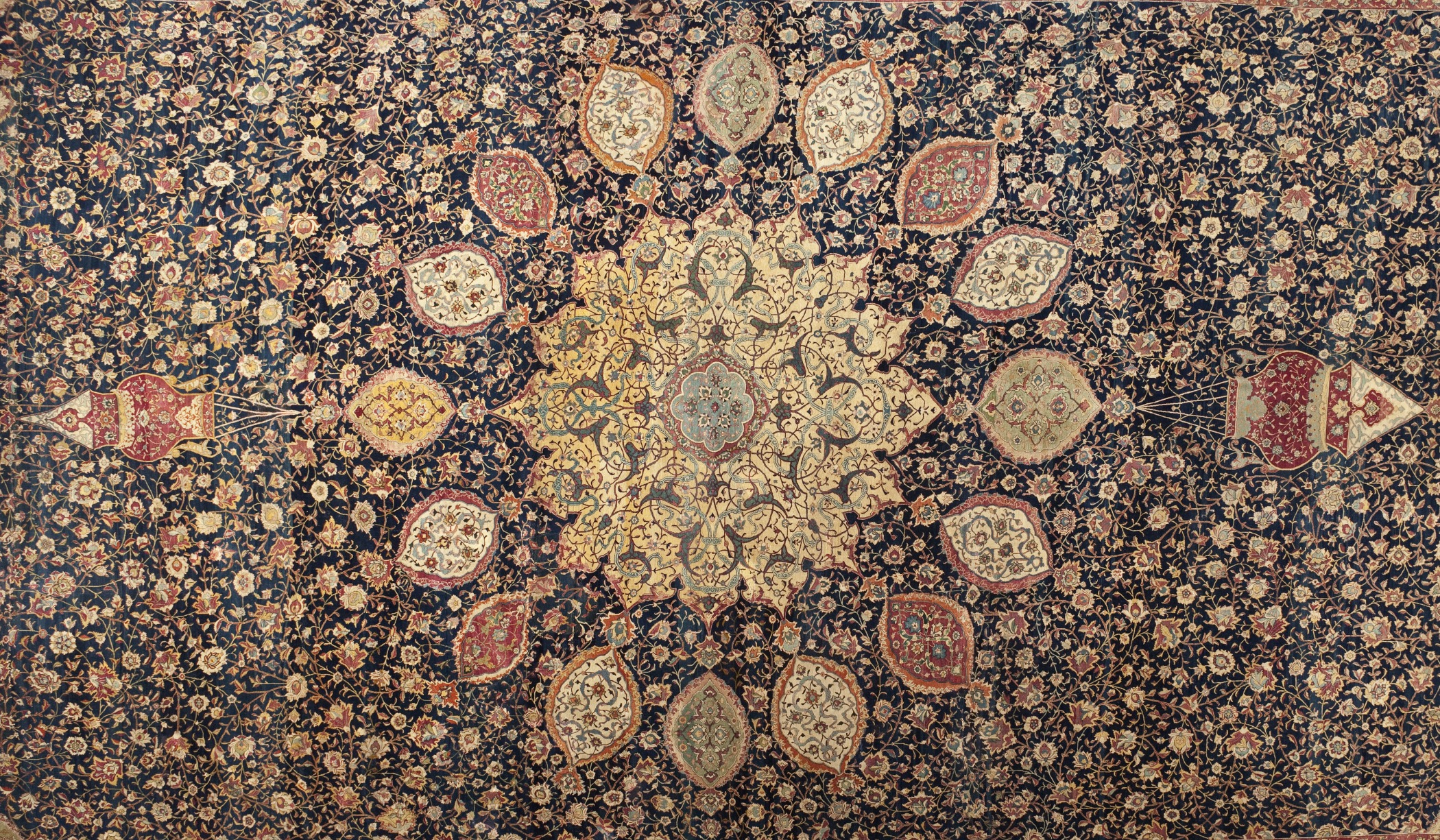
Shamsa at the center of Ardabil Carpet. Iran, 1539-40. Victoria and Albert Museum

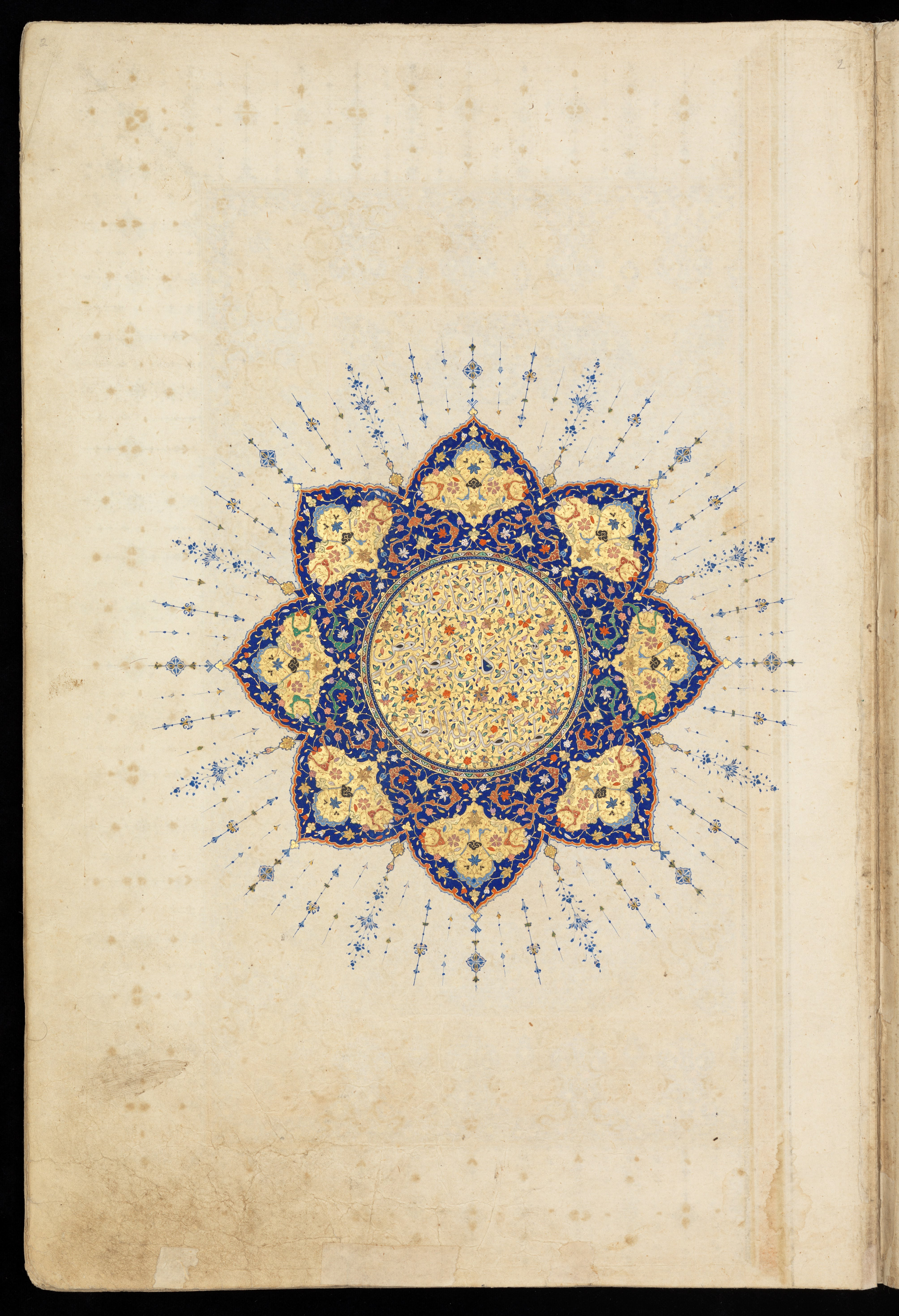
Shamsa in the frontispiece of the Ruzbihan Qur'an. Iran, c. 1550. Chester Beatty Library

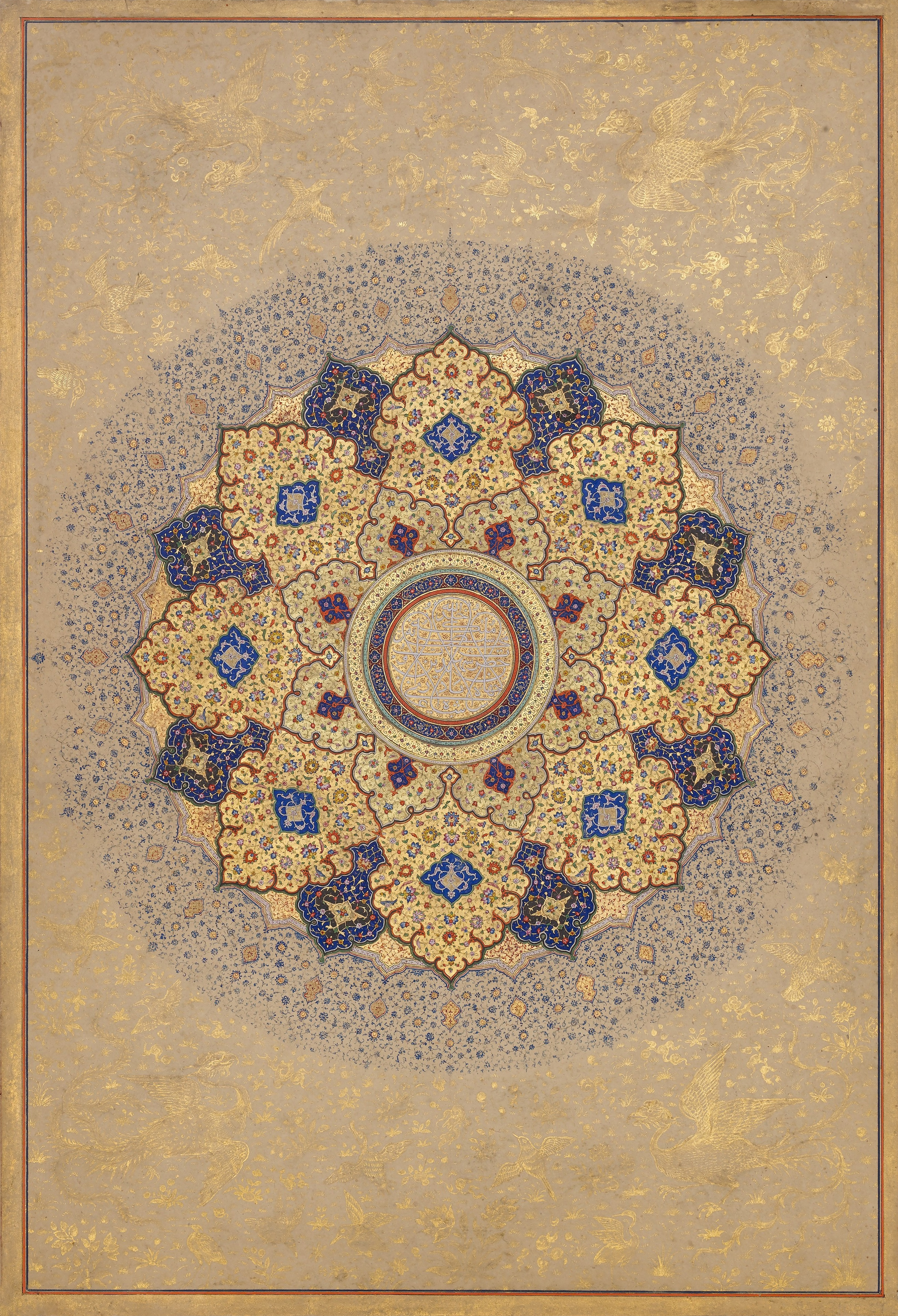
Shamsa bearing the names and titles of Shah Jahan. India, c. 1630-45. Metropolitan Museum of Art

In Islamic art, a shamsa (Persian: شمسه, romanized: shamseh; Arabic: شمسة, romanized: shamsah; Ottoman Turkish: شمسه, romanized: Şemse) is an intricately decorated rosette or medallion which is used in many contexts, including manuscripts, carpets, ornamental metalwork and architectural decoration such as the underside of domes. It can take a number of overall shapes, from circles to stars. The name means "little sun", as a diminutive of shams, the Arabic word meaning "sun", and the work is often stylised as a sunburst. It is characterized by the recurrent motifs present in Islamic art, such as the use of geometrical floral or vegetal forms in a repetitive design known as an arabesque. The arabesque is often used to symbolize the transcendent, indivisible and infinite nature of God, and as with other patterns and forms of Islamic art, the shamsa also has a religious significance, such as symbolizing the unity of God.

Shamsa is also a female first name in Arabic, Urdu, and Somali, for example Shamsa Al Maktoum, Shamsa bint Suhail Al Mazrouei, Shamsa Ali and Shamsa Araweelo.

== Arts of the book ==
In Persian manuscripts, the first page traditionally consisted of an oval rosette or medallion, above and below which there would sometimes be ornamented cartouches and palmettes. The shamsa took a number of symmetric forms, such as an eight or twelve pointed star, with arabesque or floral motifs. The central panel contained an inscription, which might be the owner of the manuscript, the author, the title of the work, or sometimes a dedication. Small shamsas also occurred in the margins of the text, a number in the centre indicating the passing of five or ten verses.

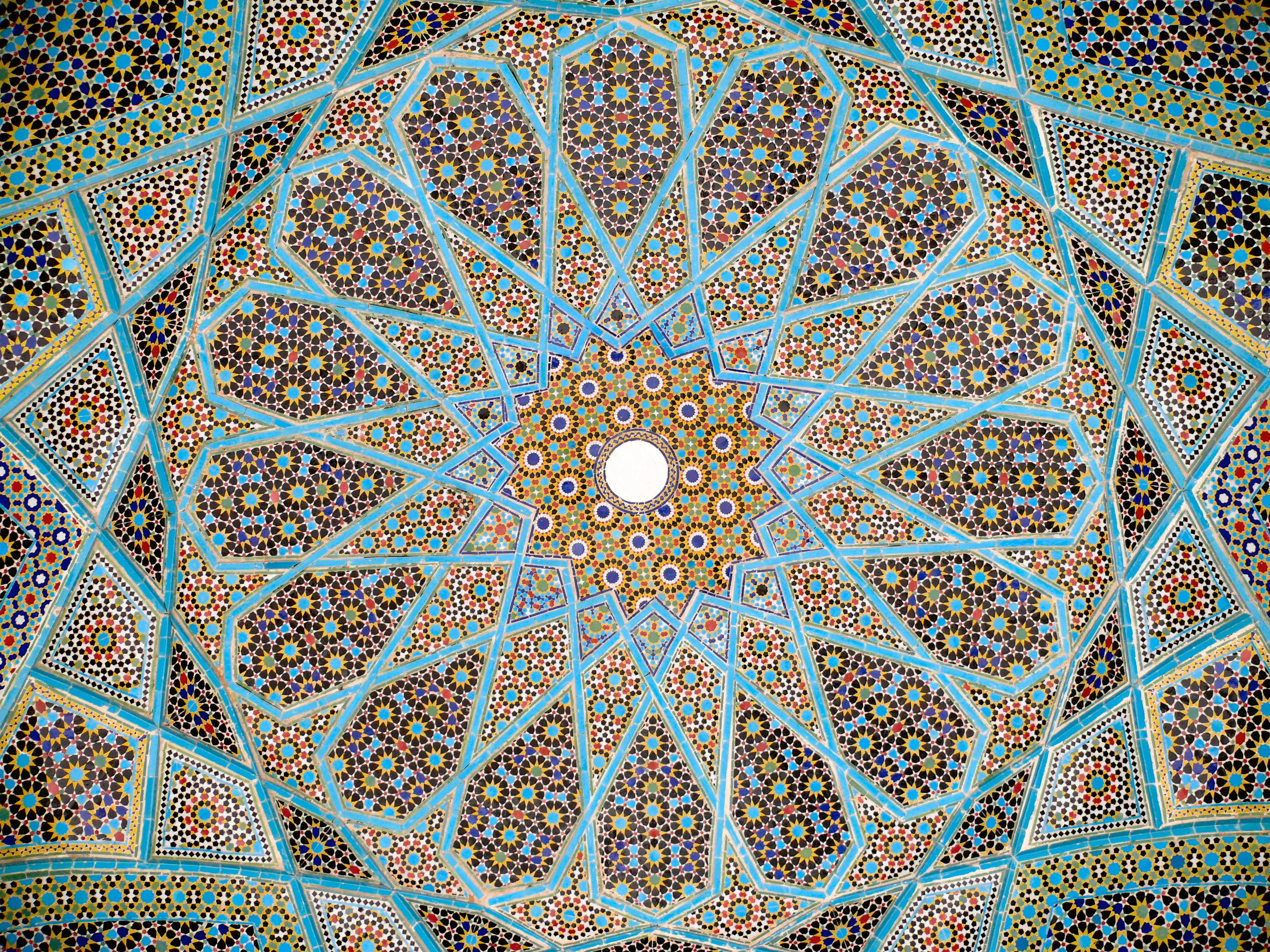
Domed ceiling of the Tomb of Hafez, Iran

The shamsa is a meticulously designed painting representing many months of work by the calligrapher, who was a specifically trained master of such illuminations. Although many similar rosettes had been produced in Persian manuscripts, the Mughal shamsa differs from them in having an element of three-dimensionality and a preference for warm colouring. The example on the right shows the frontispiece to the Kevorkian Album, a muraqqa or album compiled by Shah Jahan, emperor from 1628 to 1658, when the Mughal Empire reached the zenith of its cultural glory. The album contains about fifty paintings, illuminations and examples of calligraphy, mostly created under the patronage of Shah Jahan. The shamsa measures 38.6 by 26.5 cm (15.2 by 10.4 in) and was created around 1645. The design contains fantastic flowers, cloud bands, insects and birds. It is drawn in ink on paper and painted in opaque watercolours, and includes several shades of gold. The inscription in the central panel reads "His Majesty Shihabuddin Muhammad Shahjahan, the King, Warrior of the Faith, may God perpetuate his kingdom and sovereignty". This album is part of a collection of Islamic art held by the Metropolitan Museum of Art in New York.

The same artist seems to have produced two comparable shamsas in another of Shah Jahan's major manuscripts, the Windsor Padshahnama. A number of similar imperial albums exist, with shamsas as frontispieces, notably in collections held by the Metropolitan Museum of Art, the Los Angeles County Museum of Art, the Victoria and Albert Museum in London and the Chester Beatty Library in Dublin.

This carved ivory plaque bears the signature of an otherwise unknown craftsman, Muhammad Talib Gilani. The plaque most likely comes from the cenotaph of Shah Isma'il I, which is believed to have been commissioned for his tomb in the Ardabil Shrine by his widow, Tajlu Khanum, or by his son, Shah Tahmasp. The opulent inlaid wood decoration of the cenotaph includes ivory, ebony, and strips of bone or ivory tinted in a variety of colors.

== See also ==
- Islamic calligraphy
- Mandala
- Arabesque
- Rub el Hizb
- Star of Lakshmi
- Star of Ishtar
- Surya Majapahit
- Octagram

== Bibliography ==
- Welch, Stuart Cary, India : art and culture, 1300–1900, 1985, Metropolitan Museum of Art, ISBN 9780030061141 0030061148, google books
