= Ki Amuk =

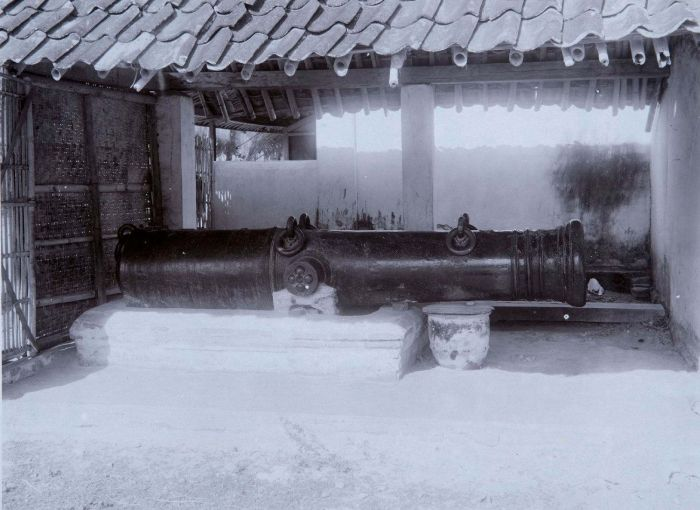
Photograph of Ki Amuk from around 1915-1926.

Ki Amuk is a medieval Javanese cannon belonging to the Sultanate of Banten, which is currently located in front of the Grand Mosque of Banten, Banten Province, Indonesia. Ki Amuk cannon was used to protect the Karanghantu Port in Banten Bay.

== Legend and history ==
According to legend, Ki Amuk was the incarnation of the cursed Sultanate of Demak soldier. But according to the historical sources, this cannon was made in Central Java in the 16th century around 1527 A.D., which was later presented to Sultan Hasanuddin of the Sultanate of Banten by Sultan Trenggono, originally named Ki Jimat. Si Jagur cannon in the Jakarta Fatahillah Museum yard is the "twin" of Ki Amuk.

== Description ==
The Ki Amuk cannon is made of bronze weighing 7 tons, with the length of 3 m (9.8 ft), the largest outer diameter is 0.70 m (2 ft 4 in), the inside diameter of the mouth is 0.34 m (1 ft 1 in). It fired a cannonball weighing 180 lb (82 kg).

The Majapahit Sun symbol can be seen in its muzzle. There are two Arabic inscriptions on this cannon. The first reads "Aqibah al-Khairi Salamah al-Imani" which means "The fruit of all good is the perfection of faith". The second inscription reads "La fata illa Ali la saifa illa Zu al-faqar, isbir ala ahwaliha la mauta" which means "There is no victor except Ali, there is no sword but Zulfiqar, thou shalt fear God (taqwa) all the time until death".

== See also ==
- Si Jagur
- Bujang Timpang Berang
- Dardanelles gun
