= 8/3 =

8/3 may refer to:

- August 3 (month-day date notation)
- March 8 (day-month date notation)
- The octagram
