= Si Jagur =

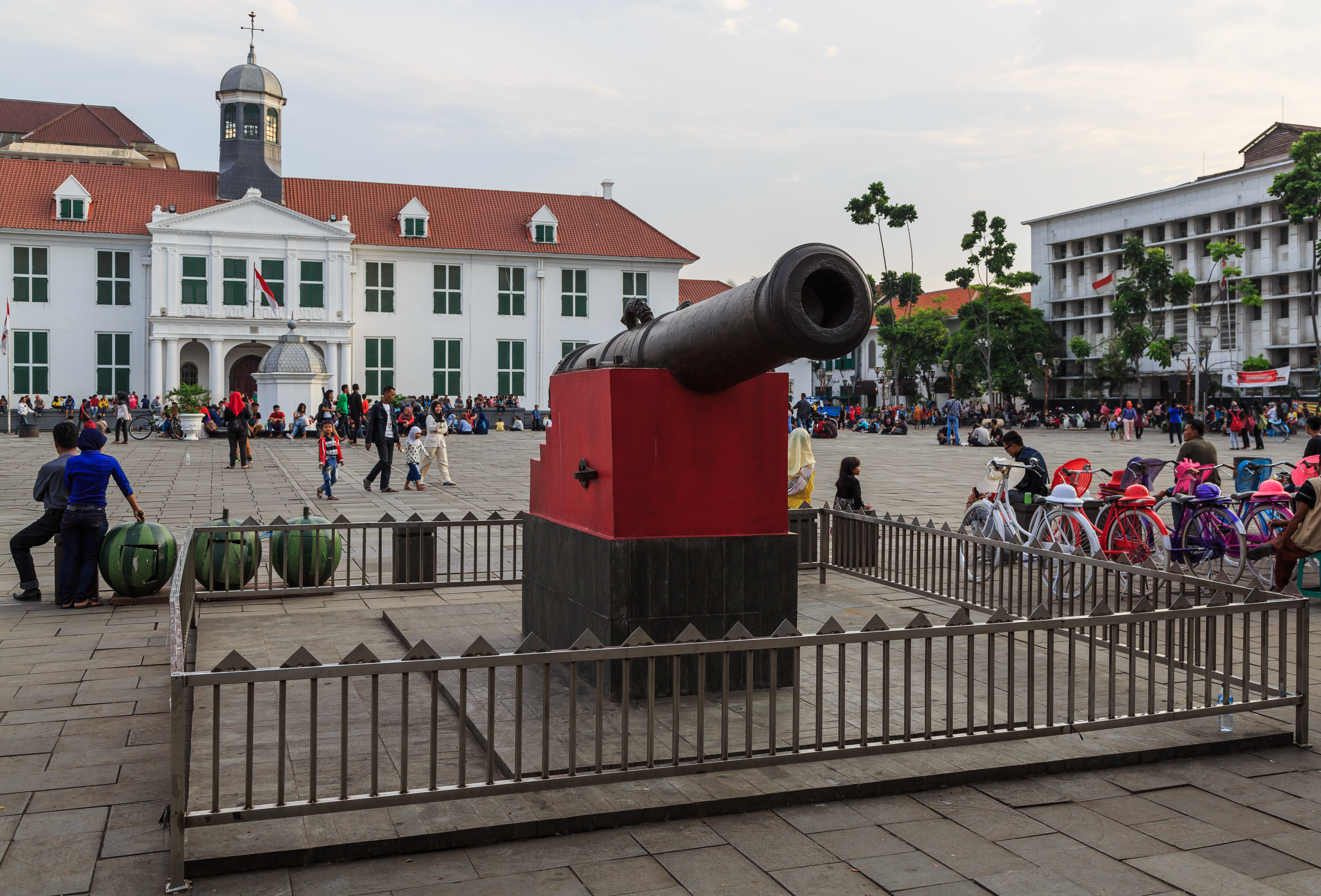
Si Jagur in the Fatahillah Square.

Si Jagur or Ki Jagur is an old cannon of Portuguese heritage which is located in the Jakarta Fatahillah Museum.

== History ==
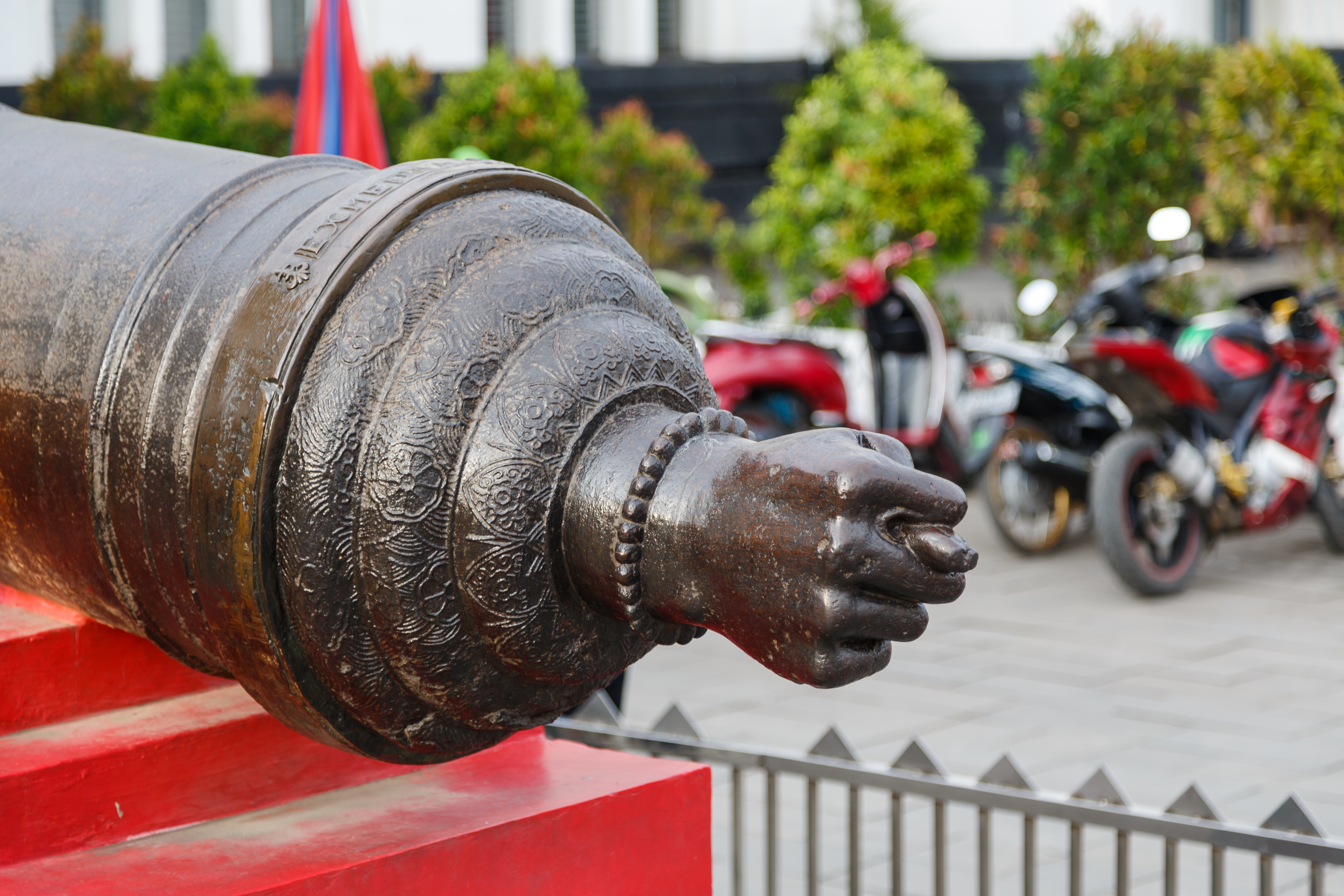
The detail on the base ring, cascabel, and knob of the cannon.

Si Jagur cannon was made by a Portuguese named Manoel Tavares Baccaro at the Chunambeiro foundry, Macau, which was then brought by the Portuguese to Melaka, In Macau, this cannon was placed by the Portuguese in the fortress of St. Jago de Barra (St. Jago = Saint James, de Barra = near the beach, therefore it was called "Si Jagur").

Si Jagur was transferred from Macau to Malacca at some time in the 16th century. It was brought to Batavia by the Dutch after capturing Malacca in 1641. At first the VOC cannon was placed in Batavia Fortress, to guard the port. Then it was moved to an artillery magazine near Tongkol street.

It is also said that Si Jagur has a "twin", the Ki Amuk cannon belonging to the Sultanate of Banten, which is currently in the courtyard of the Banten Grand Mosque. Si Jagur has a length of 3.85 m (12.6 ft) and a caliber of 25 cm (9.8 in). The weight of the cannon is 3.5 t (3.4 long tons; 3.9 short tons).

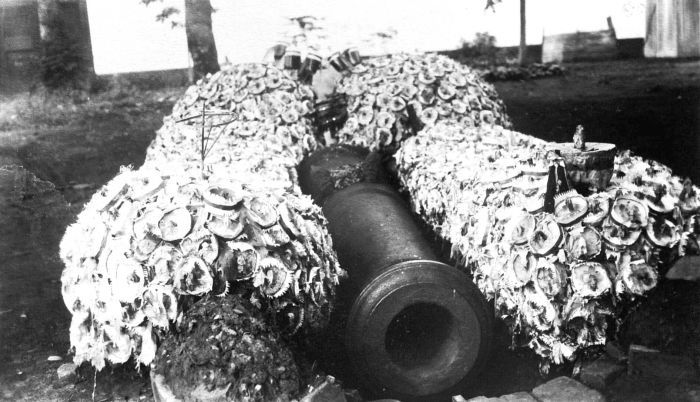
Si Jagur cannon, photo taken before 1941.

According to Voyage Autour du Monde by Ludovic Marquis de Beauvoir, the cannon was brought to its position (about 2 mi (3.2 km) from Batavia's shore) by some extraordinary tide. Malay women come and settle accounts with the tutelary deity of this gun, and pray for children. The Malays surrounded it and offering incense as well as baskets full of flowers, and the heads of fighting cocks are cut off before it.

The shape of the hand is good luck or warning off evils. This thumb shape is called "mano fico" or "mano figa" in Portuguese. Some people believed that the cannon had special powers and could help with fertility.

== See also ==
- Dardanelles Gun
