= Sixpoint Brewery =

Brewery in Brooklyn, New York

Coordinates: 40°40′26.4″N 74°0′42.4″W

- Location: Red Hook, Brooklyn, NY; United States
- Opened: 2004
- Annual production volume: 60,000 US beer barrels (70,000 hL)
- Owned by: Artisanal Brewing Ventures
- Website: sixpoint.com

Sixpoint Brewery is a brewery founded 2004, in Red Hook, Brooklyn, New York, USA. The Sixpoint logo is a combination of the brewer's hexagram and the nautical star. The company's motto is Beer is Culture, a play on the cultural significance of beer and brewing, as well as the point that yeast is, in fact, a culture. Sixpoint ascribes to a "Mad Science" approach to brewing through a use of ingredients and techniques.

== History ==
Sixpoint was founded in 2004 by Andrew Bronstein and Shane Welch who met as classmates at the University of Wisconsin. Bronstein grew up in Manhattan and provided the cash investment needed to lease facilities and begin brewing. Welch, a former homebrewer who grew up in Milwaukee created the initial recipes. The microbrewery is located in a 7,000-square-foot (650 m^{2}) factory in Red Hook that formerly manufactured filing cabinets.

In November 2018, Sixpoint was acquired by Artisanal Brewing Ventures, which already owned Southern Tier and Victory.

== Brand ==
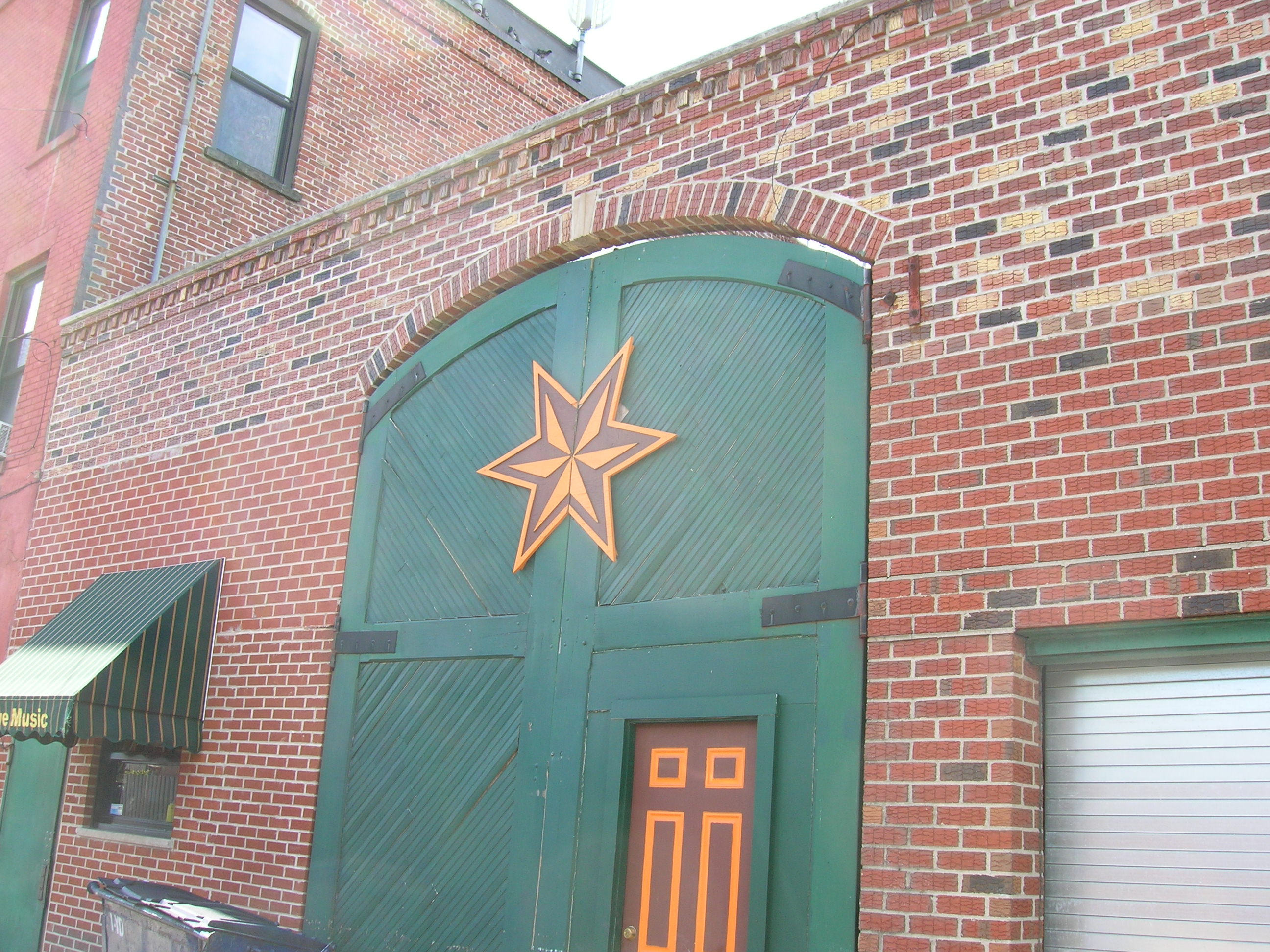
Sixpoint Brewery freight entrance on Dwight Street, Red Hook

Sixpoint began business by only distributing kegs to local bars and restaurants; instead of bottling its beer, filling growlers at bars was the only way for customers to drink the beer at their homes. Sixpoint now distributes its beer in regions throughout the country. They began canning their beer in June 2011, and began releasing seasonals the following fall. Sixpoint currently brews 4 beers year round; The Crisp (Pilz) Sweet Action (Ale) Bengali (IPA) and Resin (IIPA).

During the summer of 2014, beginning with a beer called Rad, Sixpoint began their "Cycliquids" Series en lieu of a Seasonal Program. Their unique beer releases were no longer season based, but released as they see fit.

As part of the program, Sixpoint released Sensi, a Wet Hop beer, in September 2014. Hi-Res, a Triple IPA, was released in January 2014, and re-released under the Cycliquids Portfolio in January 2015. Beast Mode Porter was released in January 2015, followed by Abigale Belgian Ale in March of that year. Jammer Gose, a salty and tart beer, came out summer of 2015.

== See also ==
- Beer in the United States
