= Nautical star =

Symbol representing the North Star

Nautical star

The nautical star is a symbolic star representing the North Star, associated with the sea services of the United States armed forces and with tattoo culture. It is usually rendered as a five-pointed star in dark and light shades counterchanged in a style similar to a compass rose.

In Unicode, this symbol is in the dingbats block as U+272F ✯ PINWHEEL STAR, referencing a pinwheel toy.

== Nautical charts ==
The nautical star indicates geographic north in compass roses on nautical charts

Modern nautical charts use the star to indicate true north on the outer of the two compass circles of a compass rose, symbolizing the North Star. The United States Coast and Geodetic Survey started using this symbol in its double-circle compass roses around 1900.

== Use as a symbol ==
=== Sea services ===
The nautical star is an informal signifier indicating membership in the United States Coast Guard, United States Navy, or United States Marine Corps. The symbol recalls both the five-pointed star of the US national flag and the color pattern of the compass rose found on many nautical charts.

Insignia including nautical stars:

- United States Coast Guard officer rank insignia
- German Navy officer rank insignia

=== Ships ===
The Endurance, in which Ernest Shackleton and crew sailed on the 1914–1917 Imperial Trans-Antarctic Expedition, was originally named after the pole star and retained a large badge in the shape of a five-pointed star on her stern.

=== Other ===
The nautical star is common in insignia, flags, and logos. Examples:

- Sixpoint Brewery in Red Hook, Brooklyn, uses a six-pointed version of the star in its logo to reflect the neighborhood's maritime history.
- Blue Stars Drum and Bugle Corps

The California flag includes a red five-pointed star, which is sometimes stylized like a nautical star:

- Called the NorCal Star, it is sometimes used to represent Northern California on clothing and tattoos.
- Sacramento Republic FC, a Sacramento, California soccer team, uses a red nautical star in its crest.

The Libertarian Socialist flag has a five pointed, red and black star that closely resembles a nautical star.

== Tattoo culture ==
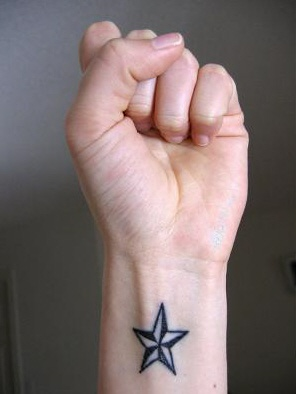
A blue five-pointed nautical star wrist tattoo

Since the 1990s, nautical star tattoos have become popular in the United States, often inspired by stories told about sailor tattoos. For people choosing these tattoos, a nautical star may symbolize protection, guidance, good luck, or finding one's way home.

In the 1950s, some lesbians in Buffalo, New York wore a blue five-pointed star tattoo on the wrist, a location that could be covered by a watch. People getting tattoos to reflect this history may choose a nautical-style star.
