= Star of Ishtar =

Symbol of the Sumerian goddess Inanna

Star of Ishtar

The Star of Ishtar or Star of Inanna is a Mesopotamian symbol of the ancient Sumerian goddess Inanna and her East Semitic counterpart Ishtar. The owl was also one of Ishtar's primary symbols. Ishtar is mostly associated with the planet Venus, which is also known as the morning star.

== History ==
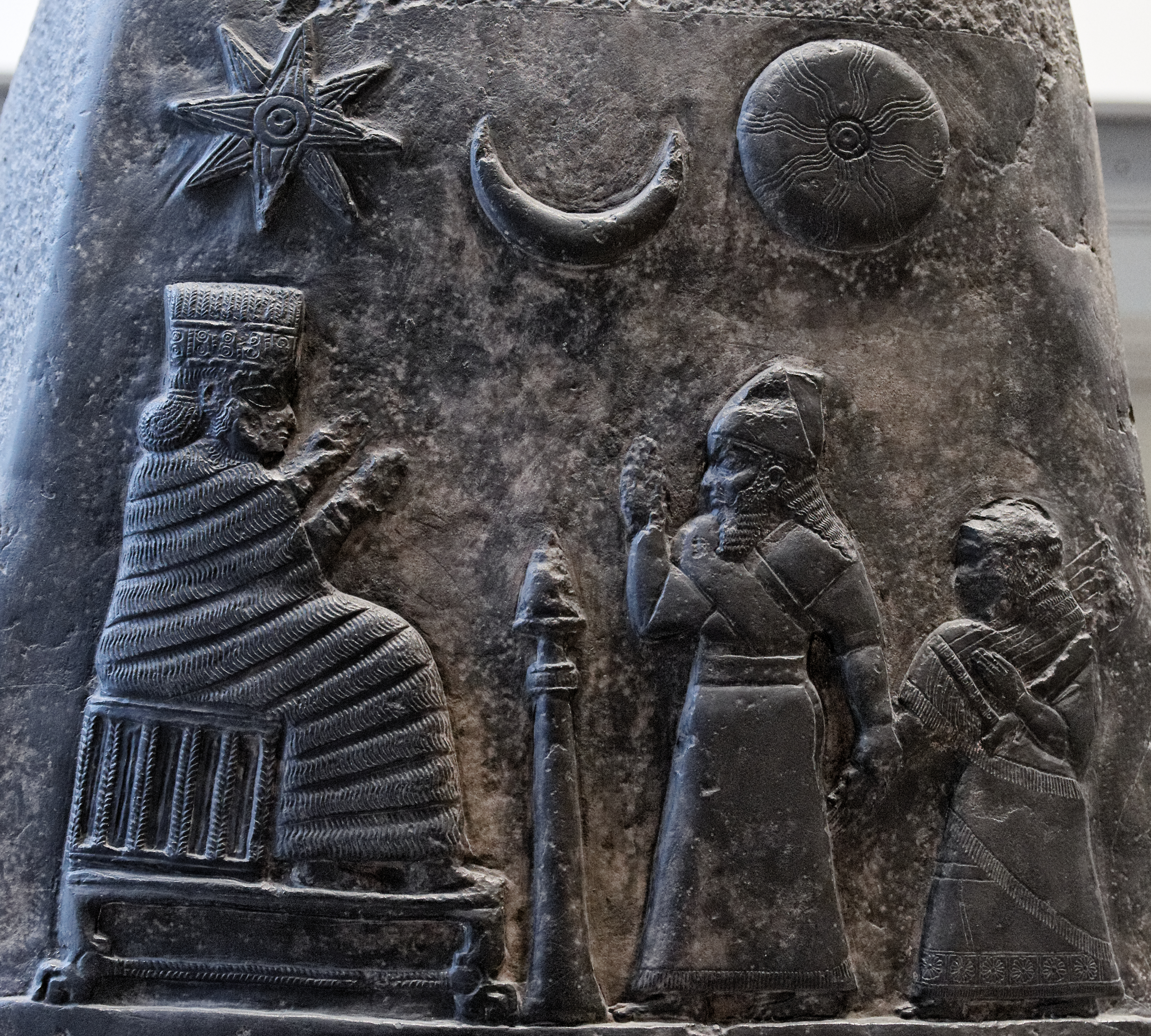
Depiction of the star of Ishtar (left) on a kudurru of Meli-Shipak II (12th century BC)

The star of Inanna usually had eight points, though the exact number of points sometimes varies. Six-pointed stars also occur frequently, but their symbolic meaning is unknown. The eight-pointed star was Inanna's most common symbol, and in later times became the most common symbol of the goddess Ishtar, Inanna's East Semitic counterpart. It seems to have originally borne a general association with the heavens, but, by the Old Babylonian Period, it had come to be specifically associated with the planet Venus, with which Ishtar was identified. Starting during this same period, the star of Ishtar was normally enclosed within a circular disc.

During later times, slaves who worked in Ishtar's temples were sometimes branded with the seal of the eight-pointed star. On boundary stones and cylinder seals, the eight-pointed star is sometimes shown alongside the crescent moon, which was the symbol of Sin, god of the Moon, and the rayed solar disk, which was a symbol of Shamash, the god of the Sun.

The rosette was another important symbol of Ishtar which had originally belonged to Inanna. During the Neo-Assyrian Period, the rosette may have actually eclipsed the eight-pointed star and become Ishtar's primary symbol. The temple of Ishtar in the city of Aššur was adorned with numerous rosettes.

== Flag of Iraq ==
Flag of Iraq 1959–1963 with the star of Ishtar in the middle

Emblem of Iraq 1959-1965, during nationalist Qasim, based on the ancient symbols of Shamash and Ishtar, and avoided pan-Arab symbolism.

In Arabic, the symbol is known as (Arabic: نجمة عشتار, romanized: najmat eshtar). The stars of Ishtar and Shamash featured on the coat of arms of the Kingdom of Iraq from 1932 to 1959.

A simplified version with red rays and a yellow centre was incorporated into the flag of Iraq from 1959 to 1963. It also featured in a combination with the sun of Shamash on the national emblem of Iraq from 1959 to 1965.

== See also ==
- Lion of Babylon
- Dingir ⟨𒀭⟩
- Octagram
- Star of Lakshmi
- Kagome crest
- Shamsa
- Rub el Hizb
