= Shamsa Araweelo =

Somali-British activist

- Born: 1993 (age 32–33); Somalia
- Known for: Anti female genital mutilation activism
- Children: 1

Shamsa Araweelo is a Somali-British activist who aims to end the practice of female genital mutilation (FGM) and support survivors of the practice.

== Early life ==
Araweelo was born in Somalia, where she underwent FGM at age 6, without any anesthesia or pain relief. Although her mother was opposed to FGM, she was not in the country at the time, and Araweelo's relatives decided to pursue it. Her seven-year-old cousin underwent FGM on the same day, with Araweelo watching. Araweelo has said she does not resent her relatives, saying that they were ignorant of the harmful effects of the practice.

Araweelo and her parents moved to North London in 2000, when she was 7. She has said she was physically and emotionally abused growing up, as her parents wanted to control her behavior. As a result, she attempted suicide three times.

After completing high school, Araweelo's mother took her to Somalia to be "re-cultured", and then took her daughter's passport with her back to the UK, leaving 17-year-old Araweelo trapped in the country. She moved in with her uncle, and it soon became clear that she was expected to marry her 15-year-old cousin. Araweelo was threatened, unable to leave her uncle's house, and had her phone taken away. After four months in Somalia, she was forced to marry her cousin. For the next six months, Araweelo was frequently beaten and raped. She was able to call her mother during this time and tell her about what was happening; until this point, her mother was unaware of the abuses she was undergoing, as the family had been lying to her. Araweelo was able to escape after convincing her husband that she needed medical treatment, and then escaping on a bus to Mogadishu. There, she met up with her maternal aunts, who kept her safe until Araweelo's brother was able to fly back to Somalia with her passport.

Araweelo's mother died of brain cancer the same month she returned from Somalia, which further disrupted her plans of going to university. After returning to the UK, Araweelo reached out to local mosques so she could obtain a religious divorce, but local leaders were unwilling to take Araweelo's word without also talking to her husband. Eventually, Araweelo's sister pointed out that the marriage had never been valid because it was forced; the sister called Araweelo's husband, at which point he agreed to divorce Araweelo.

Araweelo was homeless at the time, and moved out of London in hopes of finding affordable housing.

== Activism ==
Araweelo has called for better education and training of healthcare professionals in the UK about FGM, based on her personal experiences of seeking healthcare. She has also worked with recruits for the Metropolitan Police on "how to handle [FGM] cases with sensitivity".

Araweelo has launched her own organization, Charity of Peace, to help FGM survivors. She also works to help British citizens subject to "honour-based violence" abroad.

Araweelo has supported efforts to call rename FGM to female genital cutting (FGC), as she feels the term "mutilation" or "mutilated" may have adverse effects on survivors of the practice and discourage them from seeking assistance.

In February 2023, Araweelo joined a FGM education and prevention grassroots campaign initiated by London mayor Sadiq Khan. In April 2023, Araweelo posted a video online talking about her experience with FGM, which went viral.

In November 2023, Araweelo was named to the BBC's 100 Women list. At the time, she had more than 70 million followers on TikTok, where she posts educational content on FGM.

== Personal life ==
Araweelo had a daughter in 2014, and has been open with her about her experience as a child with FGM. She and her daughter moved to Lancashire in 2015.

As a result of undergoing FGM, Araweelo has had to deal with ongoing health problems, including severe menstrual pain and cysts. In December 2023, she travelled to Germany and underwent reconstructive surgery.

As of February 2023, Araweelo was working as a trainee police officer.
