= Rub el Hizb =

Islamic symbol in the shape of an octagram

۞o

Rub el Hizb
- In Unicode: U+06DE ۞ ARABIC START OF RUB EL HIZB

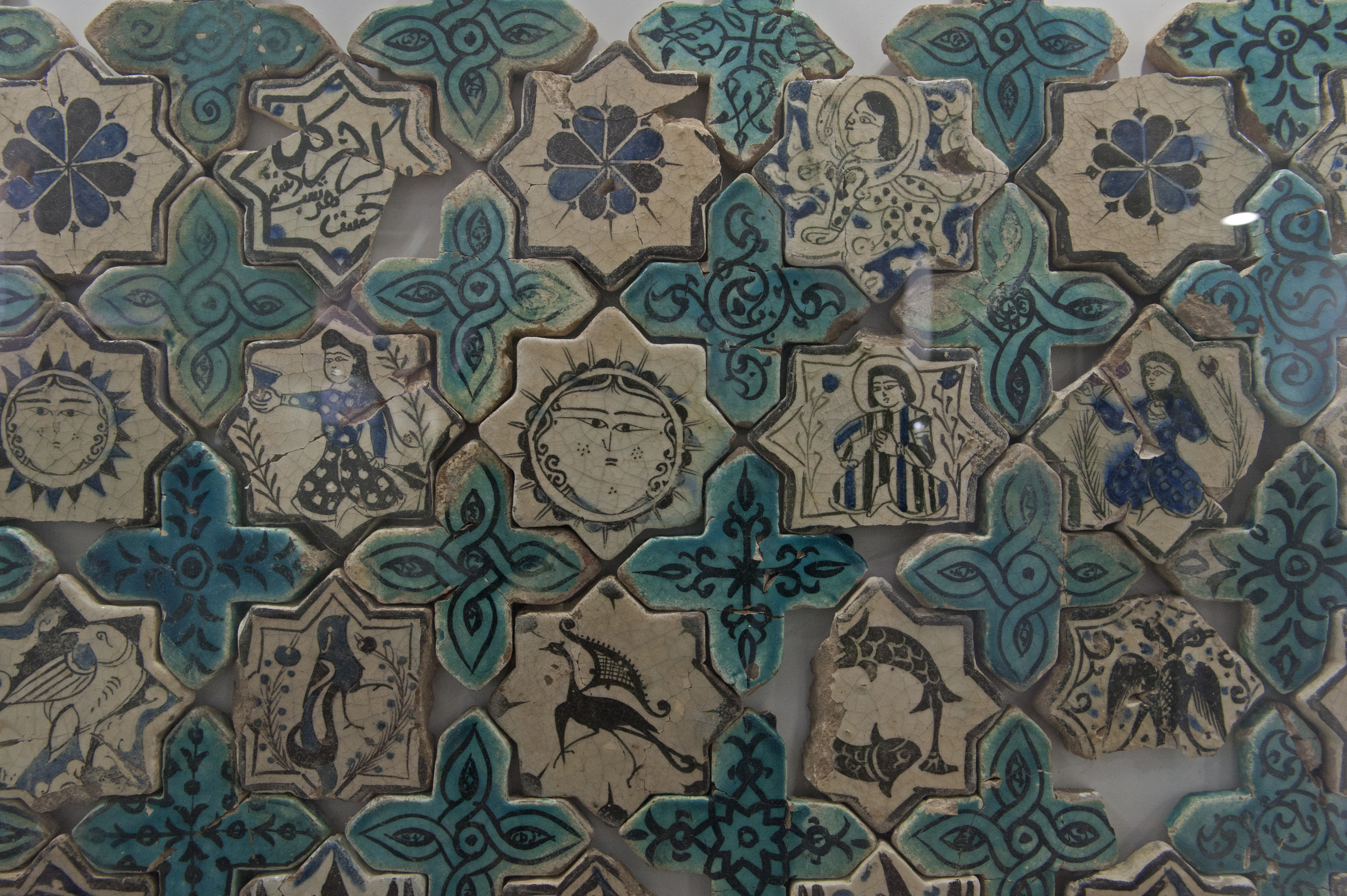
Seljuk mosaic tile decoration from the Kubadabad Palace (early 13th-century Anatolia)

The Rub el Hizb (Arabic: رُبُع الْحِزْب or رُبْع الْحِزْب rubʿ al-ḥizb 'quarter of the party') is an Islamic symbol in the shape of an octagram, represented as two overlapping squares ۞. While its main utility today is to mark a division inside some copies of the Quran to facilitate recitation, it has originally featured on a number of emblems and flags in the past and continues to do so today.

In Arabic, rubʿ means 'one-fourth' or 'quarter', while ḥizb (plural aḥzāb) translates to 'a group'. The Quran is divided into 60 aḥzāb (groups of roughly equal length in turn grouped into 30 ajzāʾ), with instances of Rub el Hizb further dividing each ḥizb into four, for a total of 240 divisions.

== History ==
The symbol was used as a cultural symbol in the time of Al-Andalus in the Iberian Peninsula, appearing on the coins. In addition, the use of it in so many areas led to its name being changed to "the star of Abd al-Rahman I". From Al-Andalus it was exported to the rest of the Arab world. It has also been used extensively in Turkic Islamic culture and history.

== Variants ==
Interlaced

Outline

== Contemporary use ==
=== Architecture ===
Development of the Petronas Towers Tower 1 level 43 floor plan from a Rub el Hizb symbol.

The symbol has been used as a basis for plans of buildings, as in the case of the Petronas Towers.

=== Former flags ===
An Ottoman flag with an eight pointed star (after 1844)

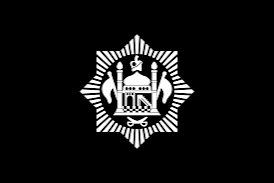
Flag of the Emirate of Afghanistan (1919–1926)

=== Current flags ===
Flag of Azerbaijan

Flag of the Kazakhstan Customs Bureau

Flag of the Organization of Turkic States

Standard of the President of Turkmenistan

Standard of the President of Uzbekistan

=== Emblems ===
Emblem of Azerbaijan

Emblem of Karakalpakstan

Emblem of Uzbekistan

Emblem of Turkmenistan

== See also ==
- Anatolian Seljuk architecture
- Armenian eternity sign
- Borjgali
- Lists of national symbols
- Sujud
- Star of Lakshmi
- Star of Ishtar
- Shamsa
- Mandala
- Surya Majapahit
- Octagram
