= Star of Lakshmi =

Octagram and symbol in Hinduism

Star of Lakshmi

The Star of Lakshmi is a special octagram, a regular compound polygon, represented by Schläfli symbol {8/2} or 2{4}, made from two congruent squares with the same center at 45° angles, and figures in Hinduism, commonly misattributed to Ashtalakshmi (Sanskrit: अष्टलक्ष्मी, Aṣṭalakṣmi, lit. Eightfold Lakshmi), the eight forms, or "kinds of wealth", of the goddess Lakshmi.

In some cases, Lakshmi is also represented by a hexagram star.

== In popular culture ==
- An eight-pointed star logo has been used by the band Faith No More, although the creator said it was a homage to the Symbol of Chaos.

== See also ==
- Leningrad Codex
- Star of Ishtar
- Shamsa
- Rub El Hizb – Islamic character
- Surya Majapahit – Used during Majapahit times to represent the gods of the directions
- Kagome crest - can be either a 6-pointed star and an 8-pointed star.
