= Surya Majapahit =

Emblem

The diagram of Surya Majapahit shows the arrangements of Hindu deities each resided in main cardinal points.

Surya Majapahit (Kawi: ꦱꦸꦂꦪꦩꦙꦭꦲꦶꦡ꧀, Sanskrit: मजपहितस्य सूर्य) (Surya of the Majapahit) is the emblem commonly found in ruins dated from the Majapahit era. The emblem commonly took the form of an eight-pointed sun ray with the rounded part in the center depicting Hindu deities. The emblem might have taken the form of a cosmological diagram haloed by typical sun rays, or a simple circle with typical sun rays. Because of the popularity of the Surya emblem during the Majapahit era, it has been suggested that may have served as the imperial symbol of the Majapahit empire.

== Hindu deities ==
The most common depiction of Surya Majapahit consists of the images of nine deities and eight sun rays. The round center of the sun depicting nine Hindu Gods called Dewata Nawa Sanga. The major gods in the center is arranged in eight cardinal points around Shiva in the center. The arrangements are:

- Center: Shiva
- East: Isvara
- West: Mahadeva
- North: Vishnu
- South: Brahma
- Northeast: Sambhu
- Northwest: Sangkara/shankara
- Southeast: Mahesora
- Southwest: Rudra

Eight other deities are located at the outer rim of the sun, symbolized by eight shining sun rays:

- East: Indra
- West: Varuna
- North: Kubera
- South: Yama
- Northeast: Isana
- Northwest: Vayu
- Southeast: Agni
- Southwest: Nirṛti
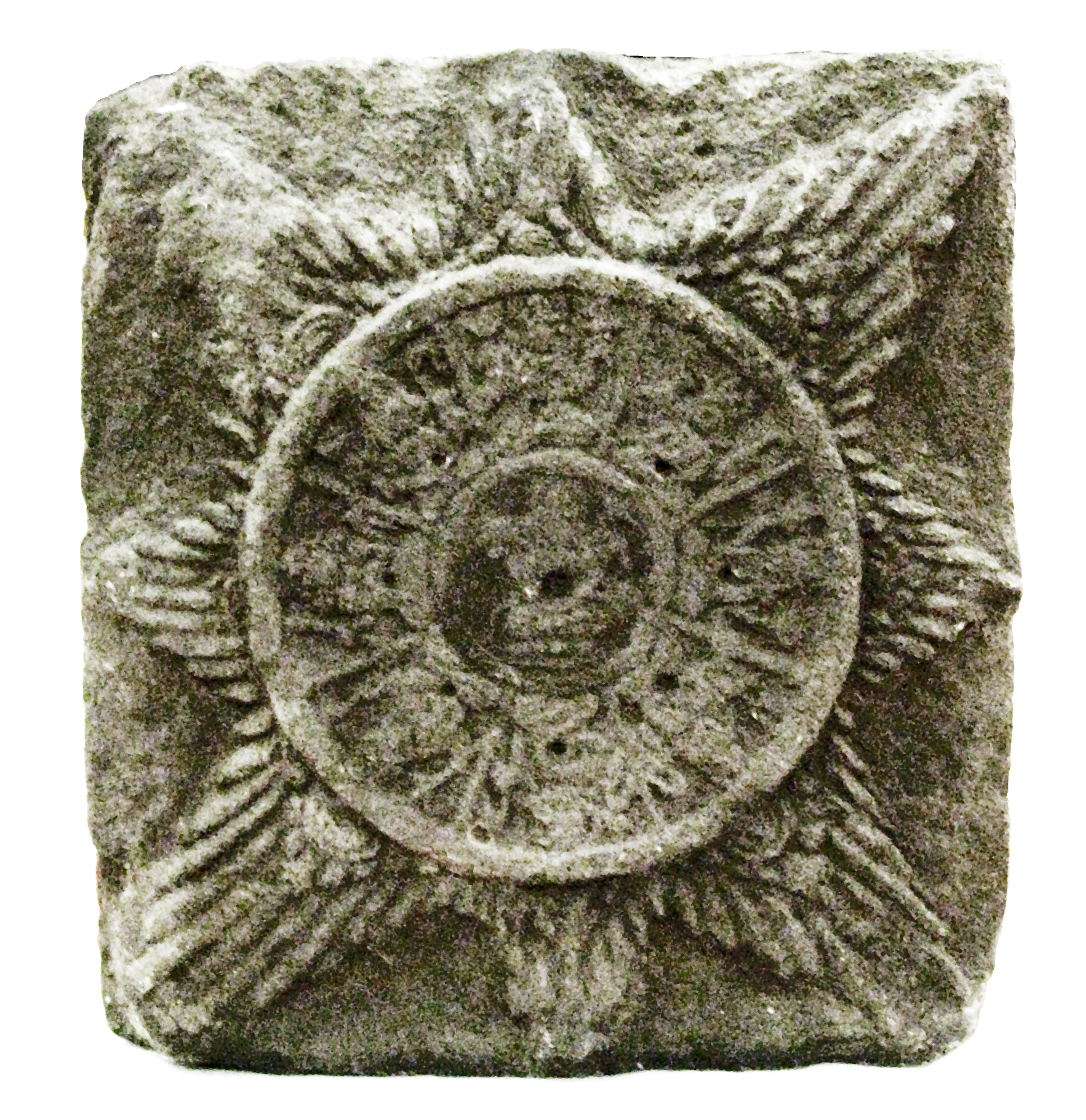
The common carving of Surya Majapahit taken from Majapahit temple ruins, Trowulan Museum

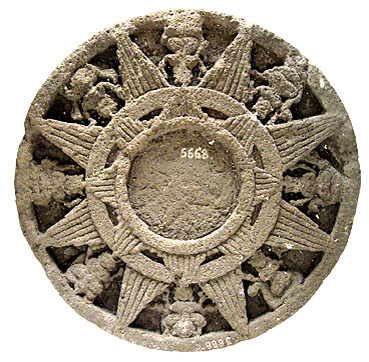
Another render of Surya Majapahit, taken from Majapahit temple ruins, National Museum Jakarta

The emblem is rendered in many forms; sometimes it took the form of the circle of deities and sun rays, or just a simple eight-pointed sun ray such as the emblematic Surya Majapahit set into the ceiling of Candi Penataran. The deities in the sun arranged as cosmological diagram in the form of a mandala. Another variation of Surya Majapahit is the eight pointed sun rays with the god of sun Surya in the center riding celestial horse or chariot. The carving of Surya Majapahit usually can be found on the center ceiling of the Garbhagriha (inner sanctum) of the temple such as Bangkal, Sawentar, and Jawi temple. Surya Majapahit also can be found on the Stella, carving of halo or aura at the back of the statue's head. The carving of Surya Majapahit also commonly found in gravestone dating from Majapahit era, such as the Troloyo cemetery in Trowulan.

== See also ==
- Star of Lakshmi — a star-shaped symbol that represents Lakshmi, the Hindu goddess of wealth
- Flags and emblems of Majapahit
